

260001–260100 

|-bgcolor=#fefefe
| 260001 ||  || — || March 26, 2004 || Kitt Peak || Spacewatch || MAS || align=right data-sort-value="0.97" | 970 m || 
|-id=002 bgcolor=#E9E9E9
| 260002 ||  || — || March 23, 2004 || Socorro || LINEAR || DOR || align=right | 3.9 km || 
|-id=003 bgcolor=#fefefe
| 260003 ||  || — || March 22, 2004 || Socorro || LINEAR || NYS || align=right | 1.1 km || 
|-id=004 bgcolor=#fefefe
| 260004 ||  || — || March 22, 2004 || Socorro || LINEAR || — || align=right | 1.2 km || 
|-id=005 bgcolor=#fefefe
| 260005 ||  || — || March 23, 2004 || Socorro || LINEAR || — || align=right | 1.3 km || 
|-id=006 bgcolor=#E9E9E9
| 260006 ||  || — || March 26, 2004 || Catalina || CSS || — || align=right | 1.6 km || 
|-id=007 bgcolor=#E9E9E9
| 260007 ||  || — || March 27, 2004 || Socorro || LINEAR || AEO || align=right | 1.4 km || 
|-id=008 bgcolor=#fefefe
| 260008 ||  || — || March 27, 2004 || Socorro || LINEAR || NYS || align=right data-sort-value="0.79" | 790 m || 
|-id=009 bgcolor=#E9E9E9
| 260009 ||  || — || March 27, 2004 || Socorro || LINEAR || — || align=right | 3.5 km || 
|-id=010 bgcolor=#E9E9E9
| 260010 ||  || — || March 27, 2004 || Socorro || LINEAR || — || align=right | 1.9 km || 
|-id=011 bgcolor=#d6d6d6
| 260011 ||  || — || March 22, 2004 || Anderson Mesa || LONEOS || — || align=right | 3.2 km || 
|-id=012 bgcolor=#E9E9E9
| 260012 ||  || — || March 24, 2004 || Siding Spring || SSS || — || align=right | 3.6 km || 
|-id=013 bgcolor=#E9E9E9
| 260013 ||  || — || March 27, 2004 || Socorro || LINEAR || — || align=right | 1.3 km || 
|-id=014 bgcolor=#E9E9E9
| 260014 ||  || — || March 18, 2004 || Catalina || CSS || HNS || align=right | 1.7 km || 
|-id=015 bgcolor=#E9E9E9
| 260015 ||  || — || March 20, 2004 || Anderson Mesa || LONEOS || — || align=right | 1.7 km || 
|-id=016 bgcolor=#E9E9E9
| 260016 ||  || — || March 29, 2004 || Socorro || LINEAR || — || align=right | 1.3 km || 
|-id=017 bgcolor=#fefefe
| 260017 ||  || — || March 29, 2004 || Siding Spring || SSS || — || align=right | 2.0 km || 
|-id=018 bgcolor=#E9E9E9
| 260018 ||  || — || March 17, 2004 || Kitt Peak || Spacewatch || — || align=right | 1.2 km || 
|-id=019 bgcolor=#E9E9E9
| 260019 ||  || — || March 17, 2004 || Catalina || CSS || INO || align=right | 2.0 km || 
|-id=020 bgcolor=#E9E9E9
| 260020 ||  || — || April 12, 2004 || Kitt Peak || Spacewatch || AGN || align=right | 1.7 km || 
|-id=021 bgcolor=#E9E9E9
| 260021 ||  || — || April 13, 2004 || Catalina || CSS || — || align=right | 2.1 km || 
|-id=022 bgcolor=#E9E9E9
| 260022 ||  || — || April 10, 2004 || Palomar || NEAT || — || align=right | 3.8 km || 
|-id=023 bgcolor=#E9E9E9
| 260023 ||  || — || April 12, 2004 || Catalina || CSS || — || align=right | 1.3 km || 
|-id=024 bgcolor=#E9E9E9
| 260024 ||  || — || April 12, 2004 || Kitt Peak || Spacewatch || — || align=right | 3.0 km || 
|-id=025 bgcolor=#E9E9E9
| 260025 ||  || — || April 13, 2004 || Kitt Peak || Spacewatch || JUN || align=right | 1.7 km || 
|-id=026 bgcolor=#E9E9E9
| 260026 ||  || — || April 13, 2004 || Kitt Peak || Spacewatch || — || align=right | 1.3 km || 
|-id=027 bgcolor=#E9E9E9
| 260027 ||  || — || April 13, 2004 || Siding Spring || SSS || — || align=right | 3.6 km || 
|-id=028 bgcolor=#fefefe
| 260028 ||  || — || April 14, 2004 || Socorro || LINEAR || H || align=right data-sort-value="0.89" | 890 m || 
|-id=029 bgcolor=#d6d6d6
| 260029 ||  || — || April 14, 2004 || Kitt Peak || Spacewatch || 627 || align=right | 2.6 km || 
|-id=030 bgcolor=#E9E9E9
| 260030 ||  || — || April 14, 2004 || Kitt Peak || Spacewatch || — || align=right | 1.1 km || 
|-id=031 bgcolor=#fefefe
| 260031 ||  || — || April 15, 2004 || Anderson Mesa || LONEOS || NYS || align=right data-sort-value="0.88" | 880 m || 
|-id=032 bgcolor=#E9E9E9
| 260032 ||  || — || April 12, 2004 || Kitt Peak || Spacewatch || — || align=right | 1.3 km || 
|-id=033 bgcolor=#fefefe
| 260033 ||  || — || April 13, 2004 || Palomar || NEAT || PHO || align=right | 3.3 km || 
|-id=034 bgcolor=#E9E9E9
| 260034 ||  || — || April 13, 2004 || Palomar || NEAT || — || align=right | 2.1 km || 
|-id=035 bgcolor=#E9E9E9
| 260035 ||  || — || April 13, 2004 || Siding Spring || SSS || EUN || align=right | 1.9 km || 
|-id=036 bgcolor=#E9E9E9
| 260036 ||  || — || April 14, 2004 || Kitt Peak || Spacewatch || — || align=right | 1.4 km || 
|-id=037 bgcolor=#E9E9E9
| 260037 ||  || — || April 12, 2004 || Anderson Mesa || LONEOS || — || align=right | 3.4 km || 
|-id=038 bgcolor=#E9E9E9
| 260038 ||  || — || April 14, 2004 || Kitt Peak || Spacewatch || — || align=right data-sort-value="0.99" | 990 m || 
|-id=039 bgcolor=#E9E9E9
| 260039 ||  || — || April 12, 2004 || Kitt Peak || Spacewatch || — || align=right | 1.8 km || 
|-id=040 bgcolor=#E9E9E9
| 260040 ||  || — || April 13, 2004 || Kitt Peak || Spacewatch || — || align=right | 2.2 km || 
|-id=041 bgcolor=#E9E9E9
| 260041 ||  || — || April 13, 2004 || Kitt Peak || Spacewatch || — || align=right | 2.4 km || 
|-id=042 bgcolor=#fefefe
| 260042 ||  || — || April 13, 2004 || Kitt Peak || Spacewatch || — || align=right | 1.2 km || 
|-id=043 bgcolor=#d6d6d6
| 260043 ||  || — || April 13, 2004 || Kitt Peak || Spacewatch || — || align=right | 2.6 km || 
|-id=044 bgcolor=#d6d6d6
| 260044 ||  || — || April 13, 2004 || Kitt Peak || Spacewatch || — || align=right | 4.6 km || 
|-id=045 bgcolor=#E9E9E9
| 260045 ||  || — || April 14, 2004 || Kitt Peak || Spacewatch || — || align=right | 1.8 km || 
|-id=046 bgcolor=#E9E9E9
| 260046 ||  || — || April 13, 2004 || Palomar || NEAT || — || align=right | 3.6 km || 
|-id=047 bgcolor=#E9E9E9
| 260047 ||  || — || April 14, 2004 || Anderson Mesa || LONEOS || — || align=right | 1.9 km || 
|-id=048 bgcolor=#fefefe
| 260048 ||  || — || April 13, 2004 || Palomar || NEAT || ERI || align=right | 2.5 km || 
|-id=049 bgcolor=#E9E9E9
| 260049 ||  || — || April 14, 2004 || Kitt Peak || Spacewatch || — || align=right | 1.1 km || 
|-id=050 bgcolor=#fefefe
| 260050 ||  || — || April 14, 2004 || Haleakala || NEAT || — || align=right | 1.6 km || 
|-id=051 bgcolor=#E9E9E9
| 260051 ||  || — || April 16, 2004 || Socorro || LINEAR || — || align=right | 2.2 km || 
|-id=052 bgcolor=#E9E9E9
| 260052 ||  || — || April 16, 2004 || Socorro || LINEAR || ADE || align=right | 3.0 km || 
|-id=053 bgcolor=#d6d6d6
| 260053 ||  || — || April 17, 2004 || Socorro || LINEAR || — || align=right | 4.0 km || 
|-id=054 bgcolor=#E9E9E9
| 260054 ||  || — || April 17, 2004 || Socorro || LINEAR || JUN || align=right | 1.4 km || 
|-id=055 bgcolor=#fefefe
| 260055 ||  || — || April 19, 2004 || Socorro || LINEAR || NYS || align=right data-sort-value="0.88" | 880 m || 
|-id=056 bgcolor=#E9E9E9
| 260056 ||  || — || April 16, 2004 || Kitt Peak || Spacewatch || — || align=right | 1.1 km || 
|-id=057 bgcolor=#E9E9E9
| 260057 ||  || — || April 20, 2004 || Socorro || LINEAR || — || align=right | 2.0 km || 
|-id=058 bgcolor=#E9E9E9
| 260058 ||  || — || April 20, 2004 || Socorro || LINEAR || ADE || align=right | 2.4 km || 
|-id=059 bgcolor=#E9E9E9
| 260059 ||  || — || April 21, 2004 || Socorro || LINEAR || — || align=right | 3.4 km || 
|-id=060 bgcolor=#E9E9E9
| 260060 ||  || — || April 16, 2004 || Socorro || LINEAR || ADE || align=right | 2.5 km || 
|-id=061 bgcolor=#E9E9E9
| 260061 ||  || — || April 21, 2004 || Kitt Peak || Spacewatch || — || align=right | 1.6 km || 
|-id=062 bgcolor=#E9E9E9
| 260062 ||  || — || April 23, 2004 || Socorro || LINEAR || GEF || align=right | 2.2 km || 
|-id=063 bgcolor=#fefefe
| 260063 ||  || — || April 25, 2004 || Socorro || LINEAR || H || align=right data-sort-value="0.73" | 730 m || 
|-id=064 bgcolor=#E9E9E9
| 260064 ||  || — || April 19, 2004 || Kitt Peak || Spacewatch || AGN || align=right | 1.5 km || 
|-id=065 bgcolor=#E9E9E9
| 260065 ||  || — || April 21, 2004 || Siding Spring || SSS || ADE || align=right | 3.1 km || 
|-id=066 bgcolor=#E9E9E9
| 260066 ||  || — || April 22, 2004 || Siding Spring || SSS || — || align=right | 2.6 km || 
|-id=067 bgcolor=#E9E9E9
| 260067 ||  || — || April 22, 2004 || Siding Spring || SSS || RAF || align=right | 1.3 km || 
|-id=068 bgcolor=#d6d6d6
| 260068 ||  || — || April 23, 2004 || Siding Spring || SSS || — || align=right | 4.6 km || 
|-id=069 bgcolor=#E9E9E9
| 260069 ||  || — || April 24, 2004 || Socorro || LINEAR || — || align=right | 2.0 km || 
|-id=070 bgcolor=#E9E9E9
| 260070 ||  || — || April 25, 2004 || Socorro || LINEAR || ADE || align=right | 2.9 km || 
|-id=071 bgcolor=#fefefe
| 260071 ||  || — || April 25, 2004 || Anderson Mesa || LONEOS || — || align=right | 1.5 km || 
|-id=072 bgcolor=#E9E9E9
| 260072 ||  || — || April 21, 2004 || Kitt Peak || Spacewatch || GEF || align=right | 1.8 km || 
|-id=073 bgcolor=#E9E9E9
| 260073 ||  || — || April 25, 2004 || Kitt Peak || Spacewatch || — || align=right | 2.1 km || 
|-id=074 bgcolor=#fefefe
| 260074 ||  || — || April 17, 2004 || Socorro || LINEAR || — || align=right | 1.4 km || 
|-id=075 bgcolor=#d6d6d6
| 260075 ||  || — || April 26, 2004 || Socorro || LINEAR || — || align=right | 5.2 km || 
|-id=076 bgcolor=#fefefe
| 260076 ||  || — || May 9, 2004 || Kitt Peak || Spacewatch || NYS || align=right data-sort-value="0.79" | 790 m || 
|-id=077 bgcolor=#d6d6d6
| 260077 ||  || — || May 12, 2004 || Catalina || CSS || — || align=right | 4.3 km || 
|-id=078 bgcolor=#E9E9E9
| 260078 ||  || — || May 13, 2004 || Reedy Creek || J. Broughton || — || align=right | 1.7 km || 
|-id=079 bgcolor=#E9E9E9
| 260079 ||  || — || May 13, 2004 || Kitt Peak || Spacewatch || EUN || align=right | 1.5 km || 
|-id=080 bgcolor=#E9E9E9
| 260080 ||  || — || May 15, 2004 || Socorro || LINEAR || — || align=right | 1.4 km || 
|-id=081 bgcolor=#E9E9E9
| 260081 ||  || — || May 15, 2004 || Socorro || LINEAR || — || align=right | 2.5 km || 
|-id=082 bgcolor=#E9E9E9
| 260082 ||  || — || May 15, 2004 || Socorro || LINEAR || JUN || align=right | 1.7 km || 
|-id=083 bgcolor=#E9E9E9
| 260083 ||  || — || May 12, 2004 || Siding Spring || SSS || — || align=right | 3.3 km || 
|-id=084 bgcolor=#E9E9E9
| 260084 ||  || — || May 12, 2004 || Catalina || CSS || — || align=right | 1.6 km || 
|-id=085 bgcolor=#fefefe
| 260085 ||  || — || May 16, 2004 || Siding Spring || SSS || MAS || align=right | 1.0 km || 
|-id=086 bgcolor=#E9E9E9
| 260086 ||  || — || May 17, 2004 || Socorro || LINEAR || — || align=right | 1.3 km || 
|-id=087 bgcolor=#fefefe
| 260087 ||  || — || May 18, 2004 || Campo Imperatore || CINEOS || MAS || align=right | 1.1 km || 
|-id=088 bgcolor=#E9E9E9
| 260088 ||  || — || May 22, 2004 || Catalina || CSS || — || align=right | 2.1 km || 
|-id=089 bgcolor=#E9E9E9
| 260089 ||  || — || May 27, 2004 || Uccle || Uccle Obs. || GEF || align=right | 2.0 km || 
|-id=090 bgcolor=#d6d6d6
| 260090 ||  || — || May 24, 2004 || Bergisch Gladbach || W. Bickel || FIR || align=right | 4.3 km || 
|-id=091 bgcolor=#E9E9E9
| 260091 ||  || — || June 6, 2004 || Palomar || NEAT || — || align=right | 2.2 km || 
|-id=092 bgcolor=#E9E9E9
| 260092 ||  || — || June 11, 2004 || Palomar || NEAT || — || align=right | 2.5 km || 
|-id=093 bgcolor=#E9E9E9
| 260093 ||  || — || June 11, 2004 || Kitt Peak || Spacewatch || — || align=right | 3.2 km || 
|-id=094 bgcolor=#E9E9E9
| 260094 ||  || — || June 11, 2004 || Palomar || NEAT || — || align=right | 3.4 km || 
|-id=095 bgcolor=#E9E9E9
| 260095 ||  || — || June 12, 2004 || Socorro || LINEAR || RAF || align=right | 1.2 km || 
|-id=096 bgcolor=#E9E9E9
| 260096 ||  || — || June 12, 2004 || Socorro || LINEAR || — || align=right | 1.7 km || 
|-id=097 bgcolor=#d6d6d6
| 260097 ||  || — || June 22, 2004 || Wrightwood || J. W. Young || — || align=right | 4.3 km || 
|-id=098 bgcolor=#E9E9E9
| 260098 Staargyula ||  ||  || June 18, 2004 || Piszkéstető || K. Sárneczky || RAF || align=right | 1.2 km || 
|-id=099 bgcolor=#fefefe
| 260099 ||  || — || July 8, 2004 || Siding Spring || SSS || H || align=right data-sort-value="0.75" | 750 m || 
|-id=100 bgcolor=#fefefe
| 260100 ||  || — || July 11, 2004 || Socorro || LINEAR || H || align=right | 1.1 km || 
|}

260101–260200 

|-bgcolor=#d6d6d6
| 260101 ||  || — || July 9, 2004 || Socorro || LINEAR || — || align=right | 4.3 km || 
|-id=102 bgcolor=#d6d6d6
| 260102 ||  || — || July 14, 2004 || Socorro || LINEAR || — || align=right | 4.7 km || 
|-id=103 bgcolor=#E9E9E9
| 260103 ||  || — || July 14, 2004 || Needville || J. Dellinger || — || align=right | 2.2 km || 
|-id=104 bgcolor=#d6d6d6
| 260104 ||  || — || July 11, 2004 || Anderson Mesa || LONEOS || — || align=right | 4.9 km || 
|-id=105 bgcolor=#E9E9E9
| 260105 ||  || — || July 15, 2004 || Siding Spring || SSS || — || align=right | 2.2 km || 
|-id=106 bgcolor=#E9E9E9
| 260106 ||  || — || July 15, 2004 || Siding Spring || SSS || — || align=right | 2.3 km || 
|-id=107 bgcolor=#d6d6d6
| 260107 ||  || — || July 16, 2004 || Socorro || LINEAR || — || align=right | 3.4 km || 
|-id=108 bgcolor=#d6d6d6
| 260108 ||  || — || July 17, 2004 || Socorro || LINEAR || — || align=right | 3.8 km || 
|-id=109 bgcolor=#d6d6d6
| 260109 ||  || — || July 16, 2004 || Socorro || LINEAR || — || align=right | 4.1 km || 
|-id=110 bgcolor=#E9E9E9
| 260110 ||  || — || August 6, 2004 || Palomar || NEAT || MAR || align=right | 1.7 km || 
|-id=111 bgcolor=#d6d6d6
| 260111 ||  || — || August 6, 2004 || Palomar || NEAT || — || align=right | 3.0 km || 
|-id=112 bgcolor=#d6d6d6
| 260112 ||  || — || August 7, 2004 || Palomar || NEAT || — || align=right | 2.8 km || 
|-id=113 bgcolor=#d6d6d6
| 260113 ||  || — || August 7, 2004 || Palomar || NEAT || — || align=right | 3.5 km || 
|-id=114 bgcolor=#d6d6d6
| 260114 ||  || — || August 7, 2004 || Palomar || NEAT || EUP || align=right | 5.3 km || 
|-id=115 bgcolor=#d6d6d6
| 260115 ||  || — || August 8, 2004 || Socorro || LINEAR || — || align=right | 3.9 km || 
|-id=116 bgcolor=#d6d6d6
| 260116 ||  || — || August 8, 2004 || Reedy Creek || J. Broughton || EOS || align=right | 2.9 km || 
|-id=117 bgcolor=#d6d6d6
| 260117 ||  || — || August 4, 2004 || Palomar || NEAT || — || align=right | 3.3 km || 
|-id=118 bgcolor=#d6d6d6
| 260118 ||  || — || August 6, 2004 || Palomar || NEAT || LIX || align=right | 4.8 km || 
|-id=119 bgcolor=#E9E9E9
| 260119 ||  || — || August 8, 2004 || Socorro || LINEAR || — || align=right | 3.4 km || 
|-id=120 bgcolor=#d6d6d6
| 260120 ||  || — || August 9, 2004 || Campo Imperatore || CINEOS || — || align=right | 4.0 km || 
|-id=121 bgcolor=#d6d6d6
| 260121 ||  || — || August 6, 2004 || Palomar || NEAT || EOS || align=right | 2.8 km || 
|-id=122 bgcolor=#E9E9E9
| 260122 ||  || — || August 10, 2004 || Socorro || LINEAR || — || align=right | 2.4 km || 
|-id=123 bgcolor=#E9E9E9
| 260123 ||  || — || August 10, 2004 || Socorro || LINEAR || — || align=right | 3.2 km || 
|-id=124 bgcolor=#E9E9E9
| 260124 ||  || — || August 10, 2004 || Socorro || LINEAR || — || align=right | 3.5 km || 
|-id=125 bgcolor=#E9E9E9
| 260125 ||  || — || August 12, 2004 || Socorro || LINEAR || EUN || align=right | 2.4 km || 
|-id=126 bgcolor=#d6d6d6
| 260126 ||  || — || August 8, 2004 || Anderson Mesa || LONEOS || — || align=right | 3.1 km || 
|-id=127 bgcolor=#d6d6d6
| 260127 ||  || — || August 9, 2004 || Socorro || LINEAR || — || align=right | 4.5 km || 
|-id=128 bgcolor=#E9E9E9
| 260128 ||  || — || August 9, 2004 || Socorro || LINEAR || — || align=right | 4.0 km || 
|-id=129 bgcolor=#d6d6d6
| 260129 ||  || — || August 11, 2004 || Wrightwood || M. Vale || — || align=right | 3.6 km || 
|-id=130 bgcolor=#E9E9E9
| 260130 ||  || — || August 12, 2004 || Socorro || LINEAR || — || align=right | 3.6 km || 
|-id=131 bgcolor=#d6d6d6
| 260131 ||  || — || August 12, 2004 || Socorro || LINEAR || — || align=right | 4.3 km || 
|-id=132 bgcolor=#d6d6d6
| 260132 ||  || — || August 13, 2004 || Reedy Creek || J. Broughton || — || align=right | 3.7 km || 
|-id=133 bgcolor=#d6d6d6
| 260133 ||  || — || August 14, 2004 || Palomar || NEAT || EOS || align=right | 3.0 km || 
|-id=134 bgcolor=#d6d6d6
| 260134 ||  || — || August 10, 2004 || Socorro || LINEAR || — || align=right | 3.7 km || 
|-id=135 bgcolor=#d6d6d6
| 260135 ||  || — || August 9, 2004 || Palomar || NEAT || — || align=right | 3.7 km || 
|-id=136 bgcolor=#d6d6d6
| 260136 ||  || — || August 7, 2004 || Palomar || NEAT || — || align=right | 3.6 km || 
|-id=137 bgcolor=#d6d6d6
| 260137 ||  || — || August 12, 2004 || Cerro Tololo || M. W. Buie || — || align=right | 2.6 km || 
|-id=138 bgcolor=#d6d6d6
| 260138 ||  || — || August 21, 2004 || Siding Spring || SSS || — || align=right | 4.1 km || 
|-id=139 bgcolor=#d6d6d6
| 260139 ||  || — || August 21, 2004 || Catalina || CSS || — || align=right | 3.2 km || 
|-id=140 bgcolor=#fefefe
| 260140 ||  || — || August 26, 2004 || Socorro || LINEAR || H || align=right data-sort-value="0.84" | 840 m || 
|-id=141 bgcolor=#FFC2E0
| 260141 ||  || — || August 27, 2004 || Siding Spring || SSS || APOPHA || align=right data-sort-value="0.77" | 770 m || 
|-id=142 bgcolor=#d6d6d6
| 260142 ||  || — || August 23, 2004 || Anderson Mesa || LONEOS || FIR || align=right | 5.4 km || 
|-id=143 bgcolor=#d6d6d6
| 260143 ||  || — || August 26, 2004 || Siding Spring || SSS || — || align=right | 4.2 km || 
|-id=144 bgcolor=#d6d6d6
| 260144 ||  || — || August 25, 2004 || Kitt Peak || Spacewatch || — || align=right | 3.7 km || 
|-id=145 bgcolor=#d6d6d6
| 260145 ||  || — || September 6, 2004 || Socorro || LINEAR || EUP || align=right | 7.3 km || 
|-id=146 bgcolor=#d6d6d6
| 260146 ||  || — || September 3, 2004 || Palomar || NEAT || — || align=right | 4.1 km || 
|-id=147 bgcolor=#d6d6d6
| 260147 ||  || — || September 4, 2004 || Palomar || NEAT || — || align=right | 4.3 km || 
|-id=148 bgcolor=#d6d6d6
| 260148 ||  || — || September 4, 2004 || Palomar || NEAT || — || align=right | 3.8 km || 
|-id=149 bgcolor=#d6d6d6
| 260149 ||  || — || September 5, 2004 || Palomar || NEAT || — || align=right | 3.9 km || 
|-id=150 bgcolor=#d6d6d6
| 260150 ||  || — || September 6, 2004 || Siding Spring || SSS || — || align=right | 4.1 km || 
|-id=151 bgcolor=#d6d6d6
| 260151 ||  || — || September 7, 2004 || Kitt Peak || Spacewatch || — || align=right | 3.5 km || 
|-id=152 bgcolor=#d6d6d6
| 260152 ||  || — || September 6, 2004 || Palomar || NEAT || — || align=right | 3.6 km || 
|-id=153 bgcolor=#E9E9E9
| 260153 ||  || — || September 6, 2004 || Siding Spring || SSS || — || align=right | 2.8 km || 
|-id=154 bgcolor=#d6d6d6
| 260154 ||  || — || September 7, 2004 || Socorro || LINEAR || — || align=right | 3.8 km || 
|-id=155 bgcolor=#d6d6d6
| 260155 ||  || — || September 7, 2004 || Socorro || LINEAR || — || align=right | 4.4 km || 
|-id=156 bgcolor=#E9E9E9
| 260156 ||  || — || September 7, 2004 || Kitt Peak || Spacewatch || — || align=right | 2.7 km || 
|-id=157 bgcolor=#d6d6d6
| 260157 ||  || — || September 7, 2004 || Kitt Peak || Spacewatch || — || align=right | 3.6 km || 
|-id=158 bgcolor=#d6d6d6
| 260158 ||  || — || September 8, 2004 || Socorro || LINEAR || — || align=right | 2.8 km || 
|-id=159 bgcolor=#d6d6d6
| 260159 ||  || — || September 8, 2004 || Socorro || LINEAR || EUP || align=right | 6.9 km || 
|-id=160 bgcolor=#d6d6d6
| 260160 ||  || — || September 8, 2004 || Socorro || LINEAR || — || align=right | 3.0 km || 
|-id=161 bgcolor=#d6d6d6
| 260161 ||  || — || September 8, 2004 || Socorro || LINEAR || — || align=right | 3.0 km || 
|-id=162 bgcolor=#d6d6d6
| 260162 ||  || — || September 8, 2004 || Socorro || LINEAR || — || align=right | 3.7 km || 
|-id=163 bgcolor=#d6d6d6
| 260163 ||  || — || September 8, 2004 || Socorro || LINEAR || — || align=right | 3.8 km || 
|-id=164 bgcolor=#d6d6d6
| 260164 ||  || — || September 8, 2004 || Socorro || LINEAR || — || align=right | 3.2 km || 
|-id=165 bgcolor=#d6d6d6
| 260165 ||  || — || September 8, 2004 || Socorro || LINEAR || — || align=right | 4.6 km || 
|-id=166 bgcolor=#d6d6d6
| 260166 ||  || — || September 8, 2004 || Socorro || LINEAR || — || align=right | 4.7 km || 
|-id=167 bgcolor=#d6d6d6
| 260167 ||  || — || September 8, 2004 || Socorro || LINEAR || EOS || align=right | 2.7 km || 
|-id=168 bgcolor=#d6d6d6
| 260168 ||  || — || September 8, 2004 || Socorro || LINEAR || — || align=right | 5.7 km || 
|-id=169 bgcolor=#d6d6d6
| 260169 ||  || — || September 7, 2004 || Socorro || LINEAR || ALA || align=right | 4.5 km || 
|-id=170 bgcolor=#d6d6d6
| 260170 ||  || — || September 7, 2004 || Palomar || NEAT || EOS || align=right | 3.0 km || 
|-id=171 bgcolor=#E9E9E9
| 260171 ||  || — || September 8, 2004 || Socorro || LINEAR || WIT || align=right | 1.5 km || 
|-id=172 bgcolor=#d6d6d6
| 260172 ||  || — || September 8, 2004 || Socorro || LINEAR || — || align=right | 4.3 km || 
|-id=173 bgcolor=#d6d6d6
| 260173 ||  || — || September 8, 2004 || Palomar || NEAT || — || align=right | 3.8 km || 
|-id=174 bgcolor=#d6d6d6
| 260174 ||  || — || September 8, 2004 || Socorro || LINEAR || Tj (2.97) || align=right | 3.8 km || 
|-id=175 bgcolor=#d6d6d6
| 260175 ||  || — || September 8, 2004 || Socorro || LINEAR || HYG || align=right | 3.3 km || 
|-id=176 bgcolor=#d6d6d6
| 260176 ||  || — || September 8, 2004 || Palomar || NEAT || — || align=right | 3.8 km || 
|-id=177 bgcolor=#d6d6d6
| 260177 ||  || — || September 8, 2004 || Palomar || NEAT || — || align=right | 4.7 km || 
|-id=178 bgcolor=#d6d6d6
| 260178 ||  || — || September 9, 2004 || Kitt Peak || Spacewatch || — || align=right | 3.6 km || 
|-id=179 bgcolor=#d6d6d6
| 260179 ||  || — || September 6, 2004 || Socorro || LINEAR || — || align=right | 5.2 km || 
|-id=180 bgcolor=#d6d6d6
| 260180 ||  || — || September 7, 2004 || Kitt Peak || Spacewatch || — || align=right | 4.1 km || 
|-id=181 bgcolor=#d6d6d6
| 260181 ||  || — || September 7, 2004 || Kitt Peak || Spacewatch || — || align=right | 3.4 km || 
|-id=182 bgcolor=#d6d6d6
| 260182 ||  || — || September 7, 2004 || Kitt Peak || Spacewatch || THM || align=right | 2.5 km || 
|-id=183 bgcolor=#d6d6d6
| 260183 ||  || — || September 8, 2004 || Palomar || NEAT || — || align=right | 4.2 km || 
|-id=184 bgcolor=#d6d6d6
| 260184 ||  || — || September 8, 2004 || Socorro || LINEAR || — || align=right | 4.4 km || 
|-id=185 bgcolor=#d6d6d6
| 260185 ||  || — || September 8, 2004 || Socorro || LINEAR || — || align=right | 3.0 km || 
|-id=186 bgcolor=#d6d6d6
| 260186 ||  || — || September 8, 2004 || Socorro || LINEAR || Tj (2.99) || align=right | 6.9 km || 
|-id=187 bgcolor=#E9E9E9
| 260187 ||  || — || September 9, 2004 || Socorro || LINEAR || — || align=right | 2.8 km || 
|-id=188 bgcolor=#d6d6d6
| 260188 ||  || — || September 10, 2004 || Socorro || LINEAR || — || align=right | 4.0 km || 
|-id=189 bgcolor=#d6d6d6
| 260189 ||  || — || September 10, 2004 || Socorro || LINEAR || — || align=right | 3.4 km || 
|-id=190 bgcolor=#d6d6d6
| 260190 ||  || — || September 10, 2004 || Socorro || LINEAR || SYL7:4 || align=right | 6.0 km || 
|-id=191 bgcolor=#d6d6d6
| 260191 ||  || — || September 10, 2004 || Socorro || LINEAR || — || align=right | 3.9 km || 
|-id=192 bgcolor=#d6d6d6
| 260192 ||  || — || September 10, 2004 || Socorro || LINEAR || — || align=right | 4.0 km || 
|-id=193 bgcolor=#d6d6d6
| 260193 ||  || — || September 10, 2004 || Socorro || LINEAR || — || align=right | 4.7 km || 
|-id=194 bgcolor=#d6d6d6
| 260194 ||  || — || September 10, 2004 || Socorro || LINEAR || — || align=right | 4.1 km || 
|-id=195 bgcolor=#d6d6d6
| 260195 ||  || — || September 10, 2004 || Socorro || LINEAR || EOS || align=right | 2.7 km || 
|-id=196 bgcolor=#E9E9E9
| 260196 ||  || — || September 10, 2004 || Socorro || LINEAR || — || align=right | 3.9 km || 
|-id=197 bgcolor=#d6d6d6
| 260197 ||  || — || September 11, 2004 || Socorro || LINEAR || — || align=right | 4.2 km || 
|-id=198 bgcolor=#E9E9E9
| 260198 ||  || — || September 7, 2004 || Palomar || NEAT || — || align=right | 4.2 km || 
|-id=199 bgcolor=#d6d6d6
| 260199 ||  || — || September 8, 2004 || Socorro || LINEAR || — || align=right | 3.7 km || 
|-id=200 bgcolor=#d6d6d6
| 260200 ||  || — || September 8, 2004 || Socorro || LINEAR || — || align=right | 3.5 km || 
|}

260201–260300 

|-bgcolor=#d6d6d6
| 260201 ||  || — || September 9, 2004 || Socorro || LINEAR || EOS || align=right | 2.5 km || 
|-id=202 bgcolor=#d6d6d6
| 260202 ||  || — || September 10, 2004 || Socorro || LINEAR || — || align=right | 4.0 km || 
|-id=203 bgcolor=#d6d6d6
| 260203 ||  || — || September 10, 2004 || Socorro || LINEAR || — || align=right | 4.6 km || 
|-id=204 bgcolor=#d6d6d6
| 260204 ||  || — || September 10, 2004 || Socorro || LINEAR || — || align=right | 4.6 km || 
|-id=205 bgcolor=#d6d6d6
| 260205 ||  || — || September 10, 2004 || Socorro || LINEAR || — || align=right | 5.3 km || 
|-id=206 bgcolor=#d6d6d6
| 260206 ||  || — || September 10, 2004 || Socorro || LINEAR || TIR || align=right | 3.6 km || 
|-id=207 bgcolor=#d6d6d6
| 260207 ||  || — || September 10, 2004 || Socorro || LINEAR || — || align=right | 4.1 km || 
|-id=208 bgcolor=#d6d6d6
| 260208 ||  || — || September 10, 2004 || Socorro || LINEAR || — || align=right | 4.3 km || 
|-id=209 bgcolor=#d6d6d6
| 260209 ||  || — || September 10, 2004 || Socorro || LINEAR || — || align=right | 4.9 km || 
|-id=210 bgcolor=#d6d6d6
| 260210 ||  || — || September 10, 2004 || Socorro || LINEAR || — || align=right | 4.2 km || 
|-id=211 bgcolor=#d6d6d6
| 260211 ||  || — || September 10, 2004 || Socorro || LINEAR || LIX || align=right | 5.0 km || 
|-id=212 bgcolor=#E9E9E9
| 260212 ||  || — || September 7, 2004 || Palomar || NEAT || INO || align=right | 2.2 km || 
|-id=213 bgcolor=#d6d6d6
| 260213 ||  || — || September 10, 2004 || Socorro || LINEAR || — || align=right | 5.7 km || 
|-id=214 bgcolor=#d6d6d6
| 260214 ||  || — || September 11, 2004 || Socorro || LINEAR || — || align=right | 4.3 km || 
|-id=215 bgcolor=#d6d6d6
| 260215 ||  || — || September 11, 2004 || Socorro || LINEAR || — || align=right | 4.0 km || 
|-id=216 bgcolor=#d6d6d6
| 260216 ||  || — || September 11, 2004 || Socorro || LINEAR || — || align=right | 4.3 km || 
|-id=217 bgcolor=#d6d6d6
| 260217 ||  || — || September 11, 2004 || Socorro || LINEAR || Tj (2.99) || align=right | 5.5 km || 
|-id=218 bgcolor=#d6d6d6
| 260218 ||  || — || September 11, 2004 || Socorro || LINEAR || — || align=right | 6.7 km || 
|-id=219 bgcolor=#d6d6d6
| 260219 ||  || — || September 11, 2004 || Socorro || LINEAR || — || align=right | 4.8 km || 
|-id=220 bgcolor=#d6d6d6
| 260220 ||  || — || September 11, 2004 || Socorro || LINEAR || — || align=right | 3.2 km || 
|-id=221 bgcolor=#d6d6d6
| 260221 ||  || — || September 11, 2004 || Socorro || LINEAR || — || align=right | 5.7 km || 
|-id=222 bgcolor=#d6d6d6
| 260222 ||  || — || September 11, 2004 || Socorro || LINEAR || — || align=right | 3.7 km || 
|-id=223 bgcolor=#d6d6d6
| 260223 ||  || — || September 9, 2004 || Kitt Peak || Spacewatch || — || align=right | 3.7 km || 
|-id=224 bgcolor=#d6d6d6
| 260224 ||  || — || September 9, 2004 || Kitt Peak || Spacewatch || — || align=right | 2.9 km || 
|-id=225 bgcolor=#d6d6d6
| 260225 ||  || — || September 9, 2004 || Kitt Peak || Spacewatch || — || align=right | 3.3 km || 
|-id=226 bgcolor=#d6d6d6
| 260226 ||  || — || September 10, 2004 || Kitt Peak || Spacewatch || EOS || align=right | 2.7 km || 
|-id=227 bgcolor=#d6d6d6
| 260227 ||  || — || September 10, 2004 || Kitt Peak || Spacewatch || THM || align=right | 2.3 km || 
|-id=228 bgcolor=#d6d6d6
| 260228 ||  || — || September 10, 2004 || Kitt Peak || Spacewatch || — || align=right | 3.5 km || 
|-id=229 bgcolor=#fefefe
| 260229 ||  || — || September 12, 2004 || Socorro || LINEAR || — || align=right | 1.0 km || 
|-id=230 bgcolor=#d6d6d6
| 260230 ||  || — || September 12, 2004 || Socorro || LINEAR || EUP || align=right | 5.4 km || 
|-id=231 bgcolor=#d6d6d6
| 260231 ||  || — || September 6, 2004 || Palomar || NEAT || EOS || align=right | 3.1 km || 
|-id=232 bgcolor=#d6d6d6
| 260232 ||  || — || September 10, 2004 || Socorro || LINEAR || EOS || align=right | 2.7 km || 
|-id=233 bgcolor=#fefefe
| 260233 ||  || — || September 10, 2004 || Kitt Peak || Spacewatch || — || align=right data-sort-value="0.64" | 640 m || 
|-id=234 bgcolor=#fefefe
| 260234 ||  || — || September 15, 2004 || Kitt Peak || Spacewatch || — || align=right data-sort-value="0.68" | 680 m || 
|-id=235 bgcolor=#d6d6d6
| 260235 Attwood ||  ||  || September 12, 2004 || Jarnac || Jarnac Obs. || THM || align=right | 2.7 km || 
|-id=236 bgcolor=#d6d6d6
| 260236 ||  || — || September 8, 2004 || Socorro || LINEAR || — || align=right | 2.8 km || 
|-id=237 bgcolor=#d6d6d6
| 260237 ||  || — || September 10, 2004 || Socorro || LINEAR || — || align=right | 3.9 km || 
|-id=238 bgcolor=#d6d6d6
| 260238 ||  || — || September 13, 2004 || Kitt Peak || Spacewatch || — || align=right | 3.5 km || 
|-id=239 bgcolor=#d6d6d6
| 260239 ||  || — || September 13, 2004 || Socorro || LINEAR || CRO || align=right | 3.9 km || 
|-id=240 bgcolor=#d6d6d6
| 260240 ||  || — || September 15, 2004 || Kitt Peak || Spacewatch || — || align=right | 4.3 km || 
|-id=241 bgcolor=#d6d6d6
| 260241 ||  || — || September 13, 2004 || Palomar || NEAT || — || align=right | 3.9 km || 
|-id=242 bgcolor=#d6d6d6
| 260242 ||  || — || September 13, 2004 || Socorro || LINEAR || — || align=right | 5.1 km || 
|-id=243 bgcolor=#E9E9E9
| 260243 ||  || — || September 13, 2004 || Socorro || LINEAR || DOR || align=right | 3.5 km || 
|-id=244 bgcolor=#d6d6d6
| 260244 ||  || — || September 13, 2004 || Socorro || LINEAR || — || align=right | 4.5 km || 
|-id=245 bgcolor=#d6d6d6
| 260245 ||  || — || September 15, 2004 || Anderson Mesa || LONEOS || — || align=right | 3.0 km || 
|-id=246 bgcolor=#d6d6d6
| 260246 ||  || — || September 15, 2004 || Anderson Mesa || LONEOS || — || align=right | 3.7 km || 
|-id=247 bgcolor=#E9E9E9
| 260247 ||  || — || September 15, 2004 || Kitt Peak || Spacewatch || AGN || align=right | 1.4 km || 
|-id=248 bgcolor=#d6d6d6
| 260248 ||  || — || September 14, 2004 || Palomar || NEAT || — || align=right | 3.6 km || 
|-id=249 bgcolor=#d6d6d6
| 260249 ||  || — || September 14, 2004 || Palomar || NEAT || — || align=right | 3.7 km || 
|-id=250 bgcolor=#d6d6d6
| 260250 ||  || — || September 15, 2004 || Anderson Mesa || LONEOS || EUP || align=right | 3.9 km || 
|-id=251 bgcolor=#d6d6d6
| 260251 ||  || — || September 6, 2004 || Socorro || LINEAR || — || align=right | 5.1 km || 
|-id=252 bgcolor=#d6d6d6
| 260252 ||  || — || September 7, 2004 || Socorro || LINEAR || — || align=right | 4.4 km || 
|-id=253 bgcolor=#d6d6d6
| 260253 ||  || — || September 8, 2004 || Socorro || LINEAR || — || align=right | 3.5 km || 
|-id=254 bgcolor=#d6d6d6
| 260254 ||  || — || September 15, 2004 || Anderson Mesa || LONEOS || — || align=right | 4.5 km || 
|-id=255 bgcolor=#d6d6d6
| 260255 || 2004 SU || — || September 17, 2004 || Three Buttes || G. R. Jones || — || align=right | 3.7 km || 
|-id=256 bgcolor=#d6d6d6
| 260256 ||  || — || September 16, 2004 || Kitt Peak || Spacewatch || — || align=right | 3.0 km || 
|-id=257 bgcolor=#d6d6d6
| 260257 ||  || — || September 17, 2004 || Anderson Mesa || LONEOS || — || align=right | 4.6 km || 
|-id=258 bgcolor=#d6d6d6
| 260258 ||  || — || September 17, 2004 || Socorro || LINEAR || — || align=right | 2.9 km || 
|-id=259 bgcolor=#d6d6d6
| 260259 ||  || — || September 16, 2004 || Siding Spring || SSS || — || align=right | 5.1 km || 
|-id=260 bgcolor=#d6d6d6
| 260260 ||  || — || September 17, 2004 || Anderson Mesa || LONEOS || TIR || align=right | 3.8 km || 
|-id=261 bgcolor=#d6d6d6
| 260261 ||  || — || September 18, 2004 || Socorro || LINEAR || URS || align=right | 4.3 km || 
|-id=262 bgcolor=#d6d6d6
| 260262 ||  || — || September 17, 2004 || Desert Eagle || W. K. Y. Yeung || — || align=right | 5.0 km || 
|-id=263 bgcolor=#d6d6d6
| 260263 ||  || — || September 16, 2004 || Kitt Peak || Spacewatch || KOR || align=right | 1.5 km || 
|-id=264 bgcolor=#d6d6d6
| 260264 ||  || — || September 17, 2004 || Socorro || LINEAR || EOS || align=right | 2.7 km || 
|-id=265 bgcolor=#d6d6d6
| 260265 ||  || — || September 17, 2004 || Socorro || LINEAR || EOS || align=right | 2.7 km || 
|-id=266 bgcolor=#d6d6d6
| 260266 ||  || — || September 17, 2004 || Kitt Peak || Spacewatch || — || align=right | 3.9 km || 
|-id=267 bgcolor=#d6d6d6
| 260267 ||  || — || September 17, 2004 || Kitt Peak || Spacewatch || EOS || align=right | 2.1 km || 
|-id=268 bgcolor=#d6d6d6
| 260268 ||  || — || September 18, 2004 || Socorro || LINEAR || — || align=right | 4.1 km || 
|-id=269 bgcolor=#d6d6d6
| 260269 ||  || — || September 22, 2004 || Socorro || LINEAR || 637 || align=right | 3.0 km || 
|-id=270 bgcolor=#d6d6d6
| 260270 ||  || — || September 22, 2004 || Socorro || LINEAR || EOS || align=right | 2.4 km || 
|-id=271 bgcolor=#d6d6d6
| 260271 ||  || — || September 23, 2004 || Socorro || LINEAR || — || align=right | 4.0 km || 
|-id=272 bgcolor=#d6d6d6
| 260272 ||  || — || September 16, 2004 || Anderson Mesa || LONEOS || — || align=right | 3.8 km || 
|-id=273 bgcolor=#d6d6d6
| 260273 ||  || — || September 21, 2004 || Socorro || LINEAR || — || align=right | 4.3 km || 
|-id=274 bgcolor=#d6d6d6
| 260274 ||  || — || October 4, 2004 || Kitt Peak || Spacewatch || — || align=right | 2.7 km || 
|-id=275 bgcolor=#d6d6d6
| 260275 ||  || — || October 2, 2004 || Palomar || NEAT || LIX || align=right | 4.7 km || 
|-id=276 bgcolor=#d6d6d6
| 260276 ||  || — || October 5, 2004 || Socorro || LINEAR || LIX || align=right | 5.9 km || 
|-id=277 bgcolor=#FFC2E0
| 260277 ||  || — || October 7, 2004 || Siding Spring || SSS || ATE || align=right data-sort-value="0.47" | 470 m || 
|-id=278 bgcolor=#d6d6d6
| 260278 ||  || — || October 8, 2004 || Socorro || LINEAR || — || align=right | 5.6 km || 
|-id=279 bgcolor=#d6d6d6
| 260279 ||  || — || October 10, 2004 || Socorro || LINEAR || — || align=right | 4.3 km || 
|-id=280 bgcolor=#d6d6d6
| 260280 ||  || — || October 4, 2004 || Kitt Peak || Spacewatch || — || align=right | 3.3 km || 
|-id=281 bgcolor=#d6d6d6
| 260281 ||  || — || October 4, 2004 || Anderson Mesa || LONEOS || — || align=right | 4.5 km || 
|-id=282 bgcolor=#d6d6d6
| 260282 ||  || — || October 4, 2004 || Kitt Peak || Spacewatch || — || align=right | 4.6 km || 
|-id=283 bgcolor=#d6d6d6
| 260283 ||  || — || October 4, 2004 || Kitt Peak || Spacewatch || EUP || align=right | 4.5 km || 
|-id=284 bgcolor=#d6d6d6
| 260284 ||  || — || October 4, 2004 || Kitt Peak || Spacewatch || — || align=right | 3.0 km || 
|-id=285 bgcolor=#d6d6d6
| 260285 ||  || — || October 4, 2004 || Kitt Peak || Spacewatch || HYG || align=right | 3.4 km || 
|-id=286 bgcolor=#d6d6d6
| 260286 ||  || — || October 4, 2004 || Kitt Peak || Spacewatch || — || align=right | 4.8 km || 
|-id=287 bgcolor=#d6d6d6
| 260287 ||  || — || October 5, 2004 || Kitt Peak || Spacewatch || — || align=right | 3.6 km || 
|-id=288 bgcolor=#d6d6d6
| 260288 ||  || — || October 5, 2004 || Kitt Peak || Spacewatch || — || align=right | 3.7 km || 
|-id=289 bgcolor=#d6d6d6
| 260289 ||  || — || October 5, 2004 || Kitt Peak || Spacewatch || — || align=right | 3.4 km || 
|-id=290 bgcolor=#d6d6d6
| 260290 ||  || — || October 5, 2004 || Palomar || NEAT || — || align=right | 4.7 km || 
|-id=291 bgcolor=#d6d6d6
| 260291 ||  || — || October 6, 2004 || Kitt Peak || Spacewatch || HYG || align=right | 3.9 km || 
|-id=292 bgcolor=#d6d6d6
| 260292 ||  || — || October 4, 2004 || Kitt Peak || Spacewatch || THM || align=right | 2.7 km || 
|-id=293 bgcolor=#d6d6d6
| 260293 ||  || — || October 5, 2004 || Kitt Peak || Spacewatch || THM || align=right | 2.9 km || 
|-id=294 bgcolor=#d6d6d6
| 260294 ||  || — || October 6, 2004 || Kitt Peak || Spacewatch || — || align=right | 4.8 km || 
|-id=295 bgcolor=#d6d6d6
| 260295 ||  || — || October 7, 2004 || Kitt Peak || Spacewatch || — || align=right | 3.1 km || 
|-id=296 bgcolor=#d6d6d6
| 260296 ||  || — || October 7, 2004 || Socorro || LINEAR || — || align=right | 4.2 km || 
|-id=297 bgcolor=#d6d6d6
| 260297 ||  || — || October 7, 2004 || Anderson Mesa || LONEOS || — || align=right | 4.8 km || 
|-id=298 bgcolor=#d6d6d6
| 260298 ||  || — || October 7, 2004 || Socorro || LINEAR || Tj (2.97) || align=right | 5.1 km || 
|-id=299 bgcolor=#d6d6d6
| 260299 ||  || — || October 7, 2004 || Palomar || NEAT || — || align=right | 5.2 km || 
|-id=300 bgcolor=#d6d6d6
| 260300 ||  || — || October 7, 2004 || Palomar || NEAT || — || align=right | 4.4 km || 
|}

260301–260400 

|-bgcolor=#d6d6d6
| 260301 ||  || — || October 8, 2004 || Kitt Peak || Spacewatch || — || align=right | 2.6 km || 
|-id=302 bgcolor=#d6d6d6
| 260302 ||  || — || October 5, 2004 || Anderson Mesa || LONEOS || KOR || align=right | 2.1 km || 
|-id=303 bgcolor=#d6d6d6
| 260303 ||  || — || October 6, 2004 || Socorro || LINEAR || — || align=right | 4.4 km || 
|-id=304 bgcolor=#d6d6d6
| 260304 ||  || — || October 6, 2004 || Palomar || NEAT || — || align=right | 4.7 km || 
|-id=305 bgcolor=#d6d6d6
| 260305 ||  || — || October 7, 2004 || Anderson Mesa || LONEOS || — || align=right | 3.3 km || 
|-id=306 bgcolor=#d6d6d6
| 260306 ||  || — || October 7, 2004 || Anderson Mesa || LONEOS || — || align=right | 4.6 km || 
|-id=307 bgcolor=#d6d6d6
| 260307 ||  || — || October 7, 2004 || Anderson Mesa || LONEOS || — || align=right | 5.4 km || 
|-id=308 bgcolor=#d6d6d6
| 260308 ||  || — || October 7, 2004 || Socorro || LINEAR || THM || align=right | 2.8 km || 
|-id=309 bgcolor=#d6d6d6
| 260309 ||  || — || October 7, 2004 || Socorro || LINEAR || — || align=right | 4.2 km || 
|-id=310 bgcolor=#d6d6d6
| 260310 ||  || — || October 7, 2004 || Socorro || LINEAR || EOS || align=right | 2.6 km || 
|-id=311 bgcolor=#d6d6d6
| 260311 ||  || — || October 8, 2004 || Anderson Mesa || LONEOS || EOS || align=right | 3.3 km || 
|-id=312 bgcolor=#d6d6d6
| 260312 ||  || — || October 9, 2004 || Anderson Mesa || LONEOS || — || align=right | 4.4 km || 
|-id=313 bgcolor=#d6d6d6
| 260313 ||  || — || October 9, 2004 || Anderson Mesa || LONEOS || EOS || align=right | 2.7 km || 
|-id=314 bgcolor=#d6d6d6
| 260314 ||  || — || October 4, 2004 || Kitt Peak || Spacewatch || — || align=right | 4.7 km || 
|-id=315 bgcolor=#d6d6d6
| 260315 ||  || — || October 4, 2004 || Kitt Peak || Spacewatch || — || align=right | 4.0 km || 
|-id=316 bgcolor=#d6d6d6
| 260316 ||  || — || October 6, 2004 || Kitt Peak || Spacewatch || — || align=right | 2.8 km || 
|-id=317 bgcolor=#d6d6d6
| 260317 ||  || — || October 6, 2004 || Kitt Peak || Spacewatch || — || align=right | 3.0 km || 
|-id=318 bgcolor=#d6d6d6
| 260318 ||  || — || October 6, 2004 || Kitt Peak || Spacewatch || THM || align=right | 2.4 km || 
|-id=319 bgcolor=#d6d6d6
| 260319 ||  || — || October 6, 2004 || Kitt Peak || Spacewatch || — || align=right | 2.8 km || 
|-id=320 bgcolor=#d6d6d6
| 260320 ||  || — || October 6, 2004 || Kitt Peak || Spacewatch || — || align=right | 3.7 km || 
|-id=321 bgcolor=#d6d6d6
| 260321 ||  || — || October 6, 2004 || Kitt Peak || Spacewatch || THM || align=right | 3.2 km || 
|-id=322 bgcolor=#d6d6d6
| 260322 ||  || — || October 6, 2004 || Kitt Peak || Spacewatch || — || align=right | 3.2 km || 
|-id=323 bgcolor=#d6d6d6
| 260323 ||  || — || October 6, 2004 || Kitt Peak || Spacewatch || THM || align=right | 2.5 km || 
|-id=324 bgcolor=#d6d6d6
| 260324 ||  || — || October 7, 2004 || Kitt Peak || Spacewatch || — || align=right | 3.7 km || 
|-id=325 bgcolor=#d6d6d6
| 260325 ||  || — || October 8, 2004 || Socorro || LINEAR || — || align=right | 4.9 km || 
|-id=326 bgcolor=#d6d6d6
| 260326 ||  || — || October 9, 2004 || Socorro || LINEAR || EOS || align=right | 3.3 km || 
|-id=327 bgcolor=#d6d6d6
| 260327 ||  || — || October 10, 2004 || Socorro || LINEAR || HYG || align=right | 3.5 km || 
|-id=328 bgcolor=#d6d6d6
| 260328 ||  || — || October 7, 2004 || Kitt Peak || Spacewatch || KOR || align=right | 1.6 km || 
|-id=329 bgcolor=#d6d6d6
| 260329 ||  || — || October 7, 2004 || Kitt Peak || Spacewatch || THM || align=right | 3.2 km || 
|-id=330 bgcolor=#d6d6d6
| 260330 ||  || — || October 7, 2004 || Kitt Peak || Spacewatch || — || align=right | 4.1 km || 
|-id=331 bgcolor=#d6d6d6
| 260331 ||  || — || October 7, 2004 || Kitt Peak || Spacewatch || HYG || align=right | 3.3 km || 
|-id=332 bgcolor=#d6d6d6
| 260332 ||  || — || October 8, 2004 || Kitt Peak || Spacewatch || — || align=right | 3.6 km || 
|-id=333 bgcolor=#d6d6d6
| 260333 ||  || — || October 5, 2004 || Kitt Peak || Spacewatch || — || align=right | 2.9 km || 
|-id=334 bgcolor=#d6d6d6
| 260334 ||  || — || October 5, 2004 || Palomar || NEAT || SYL7:4 || align=right | 5.4 km || 
|-id=335 bgcolor=#d6d6d6
| 260335 ||  || — || October 6, 2004 || Palomar || NEAT || — || align=right | 5.0 km || 
|-id=336 bgcolor=#d6d6d6
| 260336 ||  || — || October 7, 2004 || Socorro || LINEAR || — || align=right | 5.2 km || 
|-id=337 bgcolor=#d6d6d6
| 260337 ||  || — || October 8, 2004 || Kitt Peak || Spacewatch || — || align=right | 2.7 km || 
|-id=338 bgcolor=#d6d6d6
| 260338 ||  || — || October 8, 2004 || Kitt Peak || Spacewatch || — || align=right | 2.8 km || 
|-id=339 bgcolor=#d6d6d6
| 260339 ||  || — || October 8, 2004 || Kitt Peak || Spacewatch || — || align=right | 5.6 km || 
|-id=340 bgcolor=#d6d6d6
| 260340 ||  || — || October 8, 2004 || Kitt Peak || Spacewatch || TIR || align=right | 4.4 km || 
|-id=341 bgcolor=#d6d6d6
| 260341 ||  || — || October 6, 2004 || Palomar || NEAT || URS || align=right | 3.7 km || 
|-id=342 bgcolor=#d6d6d6
| 260342 ||  || — || October 7, 2004 || Kitt Peak || Spacewatch || — || align=right | 3.4 km || 
|-id=343 bgcolor=#d6d6d6
| 260343 ||  || — || October 7, 2004 || Kitt Peak || Spacewatch || — || align=right | 2.5 km || 
|-id=344 bgcolor=#d6d6d6
| 260344 ||  || — || October 9, 2004 || Kitt Peak || Spacewatch || — || align=right | 4.4 km || 
|-id=345 bgcolor=#d6d6d6
| 260345 ||  || — || October 9, 2004 || Kitt Peak || Spacewatch || HYG || align=right | 3.5 km || 
|-id=346 bgcolor=#d6d6d6
| 260346 ||  || — || October 9, 2004 || Kitt Peak || Spacewatch || — || align=right | 4.3 km || 
|-id=347 bgcolor=#d6d6d6
| 260347 ||  || — || October 10, 2004 || Kitt Peak || Spacewatch || HYG || align=right | 3.5 km || 
|-id=348 bgcolor=#d6d6d6
| 260348 ||  || — || October 7, 2004 || Palomar || NEAT || — || align=right | 4.7 km || 
|-id=349 bgcolor=#d6d6d6
| 260349 ||  || — || October 8, 2004 || Kitt Peak || Spacewatch || — || align=right | 2.7 km || 
|-id=350 bgcolor=#d6d6d6
| 260350 ||  || — || October 10, 2004 || Kitt Peak || Spacewatch || — || align=right | 4.2 km || 
|-id=351 bgcolor=#d6d6d6
| 260351 ||  || — || October 10, 2004 || Palomar || NEAT || — || align=right | 4.8 km || 
|-id=352 bgcolor=#d6d6d6
| 260352 ||  || — || October 10, 2004 || Socorro || LINEAR || — || align=right | 4.1 km || 
|-id=353 bgcolor=#d6d6d6
| 260353 ||  || — || October 10, 2004 || Socorro || LINEAR || — || align=right | 3.8 km || 
|-id=354 bgcolor=#d6d6d6
| 260354 ||  || — || October 11, 2004 || Kitt Peak || Spacewatch || — || align=right | 4.2 km || 
|-id=355 bgcolor=#d6d6d6
| 260355 ||  || — || October 12, 2004 || Anderson Mesa || LONEOS || EOS || align=right | 3.0 km || 
|-id=356 bgcolor=#d6d6d6
| 260356 ||  || — || October 14, 2004 || Palomar || NEAT || — || align=right | 3.9 km || 
|-id=357 bgcolor=#d6d6d6
| 260357 ||  || — || October 9, 2004 || Kitt Peak || Spacewatch || THM || align=right | 3.1 km || 
|-id=358 bgcolor=#d6d6d6
| 260358 ||  || — || October 12, 2004 || Kitt Peak || Spacewatch || THM || align=right | 2.4 km || 
|-id=359 bgcolor=#d6d6d6
| 260359 ||  || — || October 13, 2004 || Kitt Peak || Spacewatch || — || align=right | 3.0 km || 
|-id=360 bgcolor=#d6d6d6
| 260360 ||  || — || October 15, 2004 || Anderson Mesa || LONEOS || — || align=right | 4.4 km || 
|-id=361 bgcolor=#d6d6d6
| 260361 ||  || — || October 11, 2004 || Kitt Peak || M. W. Buie || — || align=right | 2.3 km || 
|-id=362 bgcolor=#d6d6d6
| 260362 ||  || — || October 14, 2004 || Anderson Mesa || LONEOS || — || align=right | 3.9 km || 
|-id=363 bgcolor=#d6d6d6
| 260363 ||  || — || October 10, 2004 || Kitt Peak || Spacewatch || — || align=right | 2.4 km || 
|-id=364 bgcolor=#d6d6d6
| 260364 ||  || — || October 8, 2004 || Anderson Mesa || LONEOS || — || align=right | 4.3 km || 
|-id=365 bgcolor=#d6d6d6
| 260365 ||  || — || October 19, 2004 || Socorro || LINEAR || — || align=right | 4.3 km || 
|-id=366 bgcolor=#d6d6d6
| 260366 Quanah ||  ||  || October 28, 2004 || Needville || J. Dellinger || — || align=right | 5.4 km || 
|-id=367 bgcolor=#d6d6d6
| 260367 ||  || — || October 20, 2004 || Socorro || LINEAR || — || align=right | 5.0 km || 
|-id=368 bgcolor=#E9E9E9
| 260368 ||  || — || October 23, 2004 || Socorro || LINEAR || — || align=right | 5.3 km || 
|-id=369 bgcolor=#d6d6d6
| 260369 ||  || — || October 24, 2004 || Anderson Mesa || LONEOS || — || align=right | 5.7 km || 
|-id=370 bgcolor=#d6d6d6
| 260370 ||  || — || November 2, 2004 || Desert Eagle || W. K. Y. Yeung || SHU3:2 || align=right | 8.5 km || 
|-id=371 bgcolor=#d6d6d6
| 260371 ||  || — || November 3, 2004 || Anderson Mesa || LONEOS || — || align=right | 4.6 km || 
|-id=372 bgcolor=#d6d6d6
| 260372 ||  || — || November 3, 2004 || Kitt Peak || Spacewatch || — || align=right | 4.3 km || 
|-id=373 bgcolor=#d6d6d6
| 260373 ||  || — || November 3, 2004 || Catalina || CSS || — || align=right | 5.3 km || 
|-id=374 bgcolor=#d6d6d6
| 260374 ||  || — || November 6, 2004 || Siding Spring || SSS || Tj (2.95) || align=right | 4.6 km || 
|-id=375 bgcolor=#d6d6d6
| 260375 ||  || — || November 3, 2004 || Kitt Peak || Spacewatch || VER || align=right | 4.1 km || 
|-id=376 bgcolor=#d6d6d6
| 260376 ||  || — || November 4, 2004 || Kitt Peak || Spacewatch || Tj (2.95) || align=right | 5.7 km || 
|-id=377 bgcolor=#d6d6d6
| 260377 ||  || — || November 3, 2004 || Kitt Peak || Spacewatch || — || align=right | 4.1 km || 
|-id=378 bgcolor=#d6d6d6
| 260378 ||  || — || November 3, 2004 || Kitt Peak || Spacewatch || KOR || align=right | 1.8 km || 
|-id=379 bgcolor=#d6d6d6
| 260379 ||  || — || November 3, 2004 || Kitt Peak || Spacewatch || — || align=right | 4.7 km || 
|-id=380 bgcolor=#d6d6d6
| 260380 ||  || — || November 3, 2004 || Kitt Peak || Spacewatch || — || align=right | 3.9 km || 
|-id=381 bgcolor=#d6d6d6
| 260381 ||  || — || November 4, 2004 || Kitt Peak || Spacewatch || — || align=right | 4.2 km || 
|-id=382 bgcolor=#d6d6d6
| 260382 ||  || — || November 4, 2004 || Kitt Peak || Spacewatch || — || align=right | 5.5 km || 
|-id=383 bgcolor=#d6d6d6
| 260383 ||  || — || November 4, 2004 || Kitt Peak || Spacewatch || — || align=right | 3.1 km || 
|-id=384 bgcolor=#d6d6d6
| 260384 ||  || — || November 10, 2004 || Wrightwood || J. W. Young || — || align=right | 4.9 km || 
|-id=385 bgcolor=#d6d6d6
| 260385 ||  || — || November 5, 2004 || Palomar || NEAT || — || align=right | 4.5 km || 
|-id=386 bgcolor=#d6d6d6
| 260386 ||  || — || November 5, 2004 || Palomar || NEAT || TIR || align=right | 3.5 km || 
|-id=387 bgcolor=#d6d6d6
| 260387 ||  || — || November 5, 2004 || Anderson Mesa || LONEOS || — || align=right | 5.0 km || 
|-id=388 bgcolor=#d6d6d6
| 260388 ||  || — || November 13, 2004 || Charleston || R. Holmes || — || align=right | 4.7 km || 
|-id=389 bgcolor=#d6d6d6
| 260389 ||  || — || November 4, 2004 || Catalina || CSS || — || align=right | 3.4 km || 
|-id=390 bgcolor=#d6d6d6
| 260390 ||  || — || November 7, 2004 || Socorro || LINEAR || — || align=right | 5.6 km || 
|-id=391 bgcolor=#d6d6d6
| 260391 ||  || — || November 5, 2004 || Palomar || NEAT || — || align=right | 4.8 km || 
|-id=392 bgcolor=#d6d6d6
| 260392 ||  || — || November 12, 2004 || Catalina || CSS || HYG || align=right | 5.1 km || 
|-id=393 bgcolor=#d6d6d6
| 260393 ||  || — || November 12, 2004 || Catalina || CSS || — || align=right | 3.3 km || 
|-id=394 bgcolor=#d6d6d6
| 260394 ||  || — || November 3, 2004 || Palomar || NEAT || EUP || align=right | 4.9 km || 
|-id=395 bgcolor=#d6d6d6
| 260395 ||  || — || November 17, 2004 || Siding Spring || SSS || HYG || align=right | 3.9 km || 
|-id=396 bgcolor=#fefefe
| 260396 ||  || — || November 17, 2004 || Campo Imperatore || CINEOS || — || align=right | 3.6 km || 
|-id=397 bgcolor=#d6d6d6
| 260397 ||  || — || December 1, 2004 || Catalina || CSS || URS || align=right | 5.7 km || 
|-id=398 bgcolor=#d6d6d6
| 260398 ||  || — || December 1, 2004 || Catalina || CSS || — || align=right | 4.5 km || 
|-id=399 bgcolor=#d6d6d6
| 260399 ||  || — || December 1, 2004 || Palomar || NEAT || — || align=right | 4.4 km || 
|-id=400 bgcolor=#d6d6d6
| 260400 ||  || — || December 2, 2004 || Catalina || CSS || — || align=right | 5.9 km || 
|}

260401–260500 

|-bgcolor=#d6d6d6
| 260401 ||  || — || December 2, 2004 || Socorro || LINEAR || — || align=right | 5.1 km || 
|-id=402 bgcolor=#d6d6d6
| 260402 ||  || — || December 2, 2004 || Socorro || LINEAR || — || align=right | 4.9 km || 
|-id=403 bgcolor=#d6d6d6
| 260403 ||  || — || December 2, 2004 || Socorro || LINEAR || TIR || align=right | 3.3 km || 
|-id=404 bgcolor=#d6d6d6
| 260404 ||  || — || December 2, 2004 || Palomar || NEAT || ARM || align=right | 5.6 km || 
|-id=405 bgcolor=#d6d6d6
| 260405 ||  || — || December 2, 2004 || Catalina || CSS || VER || align=right | 4.5 km || 
|-id=406 bgcolor=#fefefe
| 260406 ||  || — || December 3, 2004 || Kitt Peak || Spacewatch || — || align=right | 1.2 km || 
|-id=407 bgcolor=#d6d6d6
| 260407 ||  || — || December 7, 2004 || Socorro || LINEAR || URS || align=right | 6.5 km || 
|-id=408 bgcolor=#d6d6d6
| 260408 ||  || — || December 7, 2004 || Socorro || LINEAR || — || align=right | 4.8 km || 
|-id=409 bgcolor=#d6d6d6
| 260409 ||  || — || December 8, 2004 || Socorro || LINEAR || HYG || align=right | 4.8 km || 
|-id=410 bgcolor=#d6d6d6
| 260410 ||  || — || December 8, 2004 || Socorro || LINEAR || MEL || align=right | 4.7 km || 
|-id=411 bgcolor=#d6d6d6
| 260411 ||  || — || December 9, 2004 || Socorro || LINEAR || — || align=right | 4.5 km || 
|-id=412 bgcolor=#d6d6d6
| 260412 ||  || — || December 10, 2004 || Socorro || LINEAR || THM || align=right | 3.4 km || 
|-id=413 bgcolor=#fefefe
| 260413 ||  || — || December 10, 2004 || Kitt Peak || Spacewatch || — || align=right data-sort-value="0.94" | 940 m || 
|-id=414 bgcolor=#d6d6d6
| 260414 ||  || — || December 10, 2004 || Socorro || LINEAR || HYG || align=right | 4.1 km || 
|-id=415 bgcolor=#fefefe
| 260415 ||  || — || December 8, 2004 || Socorro || LINEAR || — || align=right | 1.1 km || 
|-id=416 bgcolor=#d6d6d6
| 260416 ||  || — || December 10, 2004 || Socorro || LINEAR || — || align=right | 4.7 km || 
|-id=417 bgcolor=#d6d6d6
| 260417 ||  || — || December 10, 2004 || Kitt Peak || Spacewatch || HYG || align=right | 4.3 km || 
|-id=418 bgcolor=#fefefe
| 260418 ||  || — || December 12, 2004 || Kitt Peak || Spacewatch || — || align=right | 1.00 km || 
|-id=419 bgcolor=#d6d6d6
| 260419 ||  || — || December 2, 2004 || Palomar || NEAT || — || align=right | 4.5 km || 
|-id=420 bgcolor=#d6d6d6
| 260420 ||  || — || December 9, 2004 || Catalina || CSS || — || align=right | 3.5 km || 
|-id=421 bgcolor=#d6d6d6
| 260421 ||  || — || December 9, 2004 || Catalina || CSS || — || align=right | 4.9 km || 
|-id=422 bgcolor=#d6d6d6
| 260422 ||  || — || December 10, 2004 || Vail-Jarnac || Jarnac Obs. || EOS || align=right | 3.5 km || 
|-id=423 bgcolor=#d6d6d6
| 260423 ||  || — || December 10, 2004 || Socorro || LINEAR || THM || align=right | 3.4 km || 
|-id=424 bgcolor=#d6d6d6
| 260424 ||  || — || December 10, 2004 || Socorro || LINEAR || — || align=right | 4.8 km || 
|-id=425 bgcolor=#d6d6d6
| 260425 ||  || — || December 11, 2004 || Kitt Peak || Spacewatch || HYG || align=right | 4.8 km || 
|-id=426 bgcolor=#d6d6d6
| 260426 ||  || — || December 11, 2004 || Kitt Peak || Spacewatch || THM || align=right | 3.4 km || 
|-id=427 bgcolor=#fefefe
| 260427 ||  || — || December 12, 2004 || Kitt Peak || Spacewatch || — || align=right | 1.0 km || 
|-id=428 bgcolor=#fefefe
| 260428 ||  || — || December 14, 2004 || Catalina || CSS || V || align=right | 1.1 km || 
|-id=429 bgcolor=#d6d6d6
| 260429 ||  || — || December 10, 2004 || Kitt Peak || Spacewatch || EUP || align=right | 5.9 km || 
|-id=430 bgcolor=#fefefe
| 260430 ||  || — || December 10, 2004 || Kitt Peak || Spacewatch || — || align=right data-sort-value="0.93" | 930 m || 
|-id=431 bgcolor=#d6d6d6
| 260431 ||  || — || December 11, 2004 || Socorro || LINEAR || EUP || align=right | 6.2 km || 
|-id=432 bgcolor=#d6d6d6
| 260432 ||  || — || December 13, 2004 || Kitt Peak || Spacewatch || — || align=right | 4.8 km || 
|-id=433 bgcolor=#d6d6d6
| 260433 ||  || — || December 14, 2004 || Catalina || CSS || URS || align=right | 5.1 km || 
|-id=434 bgcolor=#d6d6d6
| 260434 ||  || — || December 10, 2004 || Campo Imperatore || CINEOS || — || align=right | 3.5 km || 
|-id=435 bgcolor=#fefefe
| 260435 ||  || — || December 12, 2004 || Kitt Peak || Spacewatch || — || align=right | 1.3 km || 
|-id=436 bgcolor=#d6d6d6
| 260436 ||  || — || December 10, 2004 || Socorro || LINEAR || — || align=right | 4.7 km || 
|-id=437 bgcolor=#fefefe
| 260437 ||  || — || December 14, 2004 || Socorro || LINEAR || V || align=right data-sort-value="0.89" | 890 m || 
|-id=438 bgcolor=#d6d6d6
| 260438 ||  || — || December 15, 2004 || Socorro || LINEAR || TIR || align=right | 2.7 km || 
|-id=439 bgcolor=#d6d6d6
| 260439 ||  || — || December 15, 2004 || Socorro || LINEAR || HYG || align=right | 3.9 km || 
|-id=440 bgcolor=#d6d6d6
| 260440 ||  || — || December 11, 2004 || Socorro || LINEAR || — || align=right | 5.8 km || 
|-id=441 bgcolor=#fefefe
| 260441 ||  || — || December 12, 2004 || Kitt Peak || Spacewatch || — || align=right data-sort-value="0.76" | 760 m || 
|-id=442 bgcolor=#d6d6d6
| 260442 ||  || — || December 3, 2004 || Anderson Mesa || LONEOS || THB || align=right | 6.3 km || 
|-id=443 bgcolor=#fefefe
| 260443 ||  || — || December 2, 2004 || Kitt Peak || Spacewatch || — || align=right | 1.3 km || 
|-id=444 bgcolor=#d6d6d6
| 260444 ||  || — || December 2, 2004 || Catalina || CSS || HYG || align=right | 3.7 km || 
|-id=445 bgcolor=#d6d6d6
| 260445 ||  || — || December 3, 2004 || Anderson Mesa || LONEOS || — || align=right | 5.1 km || 
|-id=446 bgcolor=#d6d6d6
| 260446 ||  || — || December 16, 2004 || Anderson Mesa || LONEOS || — || align=right | 4.3 km || 
|-id=447 bgcolor=#fefefe
| 260447 ||  || — || December 18, 2004 || Mount Lemmon || Mount Lemmon Survey || — || align=right | 1.00 km || 
|-id=448 bgcolor=#d6d6d6
| 260448 ||  || — || December 19, 2004 || Anderson Mesa || LONEOS || — || align=right | 2.7 km || 
|-id=449 bgcolor=#fefefe
| 260449 ||  || — || January 6, 2005 || Catalina || CSS || — || align=right data-sort-value="0.78" | 780 m || 
|-id=450 bgcolor=#fefefe
| 260450 ||  || — || January 6, 2005 || Catalina || CSS || — || align=right | 1.1 km || 
|-id=451 bgcolor=#fefefe
| 260451 ||  || — || January 6, 2005 || Catalina || CSS || — || align=right | 1.3 km || 
|-id=452 bgcolor=#fefefe
| 260452 ||  || — || January 6, 2005 || Catalina || CSS || — || align=right | 2.9 km || 
|-id=453 bgcolor=#fefefe
| 260453 ||  || — || January 8, 2005 || Campo Imperatore || CINEOS || SUL || align=right | 2.5 km || 
|-id=454 bgcolor=#fefefe
| 260454 ||  || — || January 15, 2005 || Kvistaberg || UDAS || — || align=right data-sort-value="0.89" | 890 m || 
|-id=455 bgcolor=#fefefe
| 260455 ||  || — || January 11, 2005 || Socorro || LINEAR || FLO || align=right data-sort-value="0.89" | 890 m || 
|-id=456 bgcolor=#fefefe
| 260456 ||  || — || January 15, 2005 || Socorro || LINEAR || — || align=right | 1.1 km || 
|-id=457 bgcolor=#fefefe
| 260457 ||  || — || January 15, 2005 || Socorro || LINEAR || — || align=right | 1.1 km || 
|-id=458 bgcolor=#d6d6d6
| 260458 ||  || — || January 13, 2005 || Socorro || LINEAR || EOS || align=right | 2.8 km || 
|-id=459 bgcolor=#d6d6d6
| 260459 ||  || — || January 15, 2005 || Catalina || CSS || JLI || align=right | 5.6 km || 
|-id=460 bgcolor=#fefefe
| 260460 ||  || — || January 15, 2005 || Anderson Mesa || LONEOS || — || align=right | 1.3 km || 
|-id=461 bgcolor=#fefefe
| 260461 ||  || — || January 15, 2005 || Kitt Peak || Spacewatch || MAS || align=right | 1.00 km || 
|-id=462 bgcolor=#fefefe
| 260462 ||  || — || January 15, 2005 || Kitt Peak || Spacewatch || ERI || align=right | 1.7 km || 
|-id=463 bgcolor=#fefefe
| 260463 ||  || — || January 15, 2005 || Kitt Peak || Spacewatch || — || align=right | 1.2 km || 
|-id=464 bgcolor=#d6d6d6
| 260464 ||  || — || January 15, 2005 || Kitt Peak || Spacewatch || 3:2 || align=right | 5.9 km || 
|-id=465 bgcolor=#d6d6d6
| 260465 ||  || — || January 16, 2005 || Desert Eagle || W. K. Y. Yeung || HYG || align=right | 3.7 km || 
|-id=466 bgcolor=#d6d6d6
| 260466 ||  || — || January 16, 2005 || Socorro || LINEAR || — || align=right | 5.2 km || 
|-id=467 bgcolor=#fefefe
| 260467 ||  || — || January 16, 2005 || Socorro || LINEAR || V || align=right data-sort-value="0.89" | 890 m || 
|-id=468 bgcolor=#fefefe
| 260468 ||  || — || January 16, 2005 || Kitt Peak || Spacewatch || — || align=right data-sort-value="0.85" | 850 m || 
|-id=469 bgcolor=#fefefe
| 260469 ||  || — || January 16, 2005 || Kitt Peak || Spacewatch || — || align=right data-sort-value="0.92" | 920 m || 
|-id=470 bgcolor=#d6d6d6
| 260470 ||  || — || January 16, 2005 || Socorro || LINEAR || — || align=right | 7.9 km || 
|-id=471 bgcolor=#fefefe
| 260471 ||  || — || January 18, 2005 || Catalina || CSS || FLO || align=right data-sort-value="0.86" | 860 m || 
|-id=472 bgcolor=#d6d6d6
| 260472 ||  || — || January 29, 2005 || Socorro || LINEAR || EUP || align=right | 6.9 km || 
|-id=473 bgcolor=#d6d6d6
| 260473 ||  || — || January 31, 2005 || Goodricke-Pigott || R. A. Tucker || ALA || align=right | 7.3 km || 
|-id=474 bgcolor=#fefefe
| 260474 ||  || — || January 19, 2005 || Kitt Peak || Spacewatch || NYS || align=right data-sort-value="0.85" | 850 m || 
|-id=475 bgcolor=#fefefe
| 260475 ||  || — || February 1, 2005 || Palomar || NEAT || FLO || align=right data-sort-value="0.97" | 970 m || 
|-id=476 bgcolor=#fefefe
| 260476 ||  || — || February 1, 2005 || Kitt Peak || Spacewatch || — || align=right | 1.2 km || 
|-id=477 bgcolor=#fefefe
| 260477 ||  || — || February 1, 2005 || Palomar || NEAT || — || align=right data-sort-value="0.87" | 870 m || 
|-id=478 bgcolor=#E9E9E9
| 260478 ||  || — || February 4, 2005 || Palomar || NEAT || — || align=right | 2.4 km || 
|-id=479 bgcolor=#fefefe
| 260479 ||  || — || February 1, 2005 || Kitt Peak || Spacewatch || — || align=right | 1.2 km || 
|-id=480 bgcolor=#fefefe
| 260480 ||  || — || February 2, 2005 || Catalina || CSS || — || align=right | 1.3 km || 
|-id=481 bgcolor=#fefefe
| 260481 ||  || — || February 2, 2005 || Kitt Peak || Spacewatch || NYS || align=right data-sort-value="0.85" | 850 m || 
|-id=482 bgcolor=#fefefe
| 260482 ||  || — || February 2, 2005 || Kitt Peak || Spacewatch || NYS || align=right data-sort-value="0.70" | 700 m || 
|-id=483 bgcolor=#fefefe
| 260483 ||  || — || February 9, 2005 || Gnosca || S. Sposetti || — || align=right data-sort-value="0.94" | 940 m || 
|-id=484 bgcolor=#fefefe
| 260484 ||  || — || February 2, 2005 || Kitt Peak || Spacewatch || — || align=right data-sort-value="0.72" | 720 m || 
|-id=485 bgcolor=#fefefe
| 260485 ||  || — || February 2, 2005 || Kitt Peak || Spacewatch || V || align=right | 2.3 km || 
|-id=486 bgcolor=#fefefe
| 260486 ||  || — || February 2, 2005 || Kitt Peak || Spacewatch || — || align=right data-sort-value="0.98" | 980 m || 
|-id=487 bgcolor=#fefefe
| 260487 ||  || — || February 2, 2005 || Catalina || CSS || V || align=right data-sort-value="0.98" | 980 m || 
|-id=488 bgcolor=#d6d6d6
| 260488 ||  || — || February 2, 2005 || Catalina || CSS || — || align=right | 4.6 km || 
|-id=489 bgcolor=#fefefe
| 260489 ||  || — || February 9, 2005 || Kitt Peak || Spacewatch || NYS || align=right data-sort-value="0.79" | 790 m || 
|-id=490 bgcolor=#fefefe
| 260490 ||  || — || February 9, 2005 || Socorro || LINEAR || MAS || align=right | 1.1 km || 
|-id=491 bgcolor=#d6d6d6
| 260491 ||  || — || February 1, 2005 || Kitt Peak || Spacewatch || 7:4 || align=right | 5.4 km || 
|-id=492 bgcolor=#fefefe
| 260492 ||  || — || February 9, 2005 || Socorro || LINEAR || NYS || align=right data-sort-value="0.92" | 920 m || 
|-id=493 bgcolor=#fefefe
| 260493 ||  || — || March 3, 2005 || Vail-Jarnac || Jarnac Obs. || — || align=right | 1.4 km || 
|-id=494 bgcolor=#fefefe
| 260494 ||  || — || March 1, 2005 || Kitt Peak || Spacewatch || — || align=right | 1.4 km || 
|-id=495 bgcolor=#fefefe
| 260495 ||  || — || March 1, 2005 || Kitt Peak || Spacewatch || — || align=right | 1.2 km || 
|-id=496 bgcolor=#fefefe
| 260496 ||  || — || March 2, 2005 || Kitt Peak || Spacewatch || FLO || align=right data-sort-value="0.98" | 980 m || 
|-id=497 bgcolor=#fefefe
| 260497 ||  || — || March 2, 2005 || Kitt Peak || Spacewatch || — || align=right | 1.0 km || 
|-id=498 bgcolor=#E9E9E9
| 260498 ||  || — || March 3, 2005 || Kitt Peak || Spacewatch || — || align=right | 1.3 km || 
|-id=499 bgcolor=#fefefe
| 260499 ||  || — || March 3, 2005 || Kitt Peak || Spacewatch || V || align=right data-sort-value="0.72" | 720 m || 
|-id=500 bgcolor=#fefefe
| 260500 ||  || — || March 3, 2005 || Kitt Peak || Spacewatch || — || align=right data-sort-value="0.74" | 740 m || 
|}

260501–260600 

|-bgcolor=#fefefe
| 260501 ||  || — || March 3, 2005 || Catalina || CSS || — || align=right | 1.0 km || 
|-id=502 bgcolor=#fefefe
| 260502 ||  || — || March 3, 2005 || Catalina || CSS || — || align=right data-sort-value="0.92" | 920 m || 
|-id=503 bgcolor=#fefefe
| 260503 ||  || — || March 3, 2005 || Catalina || CSS || — || align=right data-sort-value="0.96" | 960 m || 
|-id=504 bgcolor=#d6d6d6
| 260504 ||  || — || March 3, 2005 || Catalina || CSS || — || align=right | 4.1 km || 
|-id=505 bgcolor=#fefefe
| 260505 ||  || — || March 5, 2005 || Kitami || K. Endate || — || align=right | 1.4 km || 
|-id=506 bgcolor=#fefefe
| 260506 ||  || — || March 3, 2005 || Catalina || CSS || NYS || align=right data-sort-value="0.81" | 810 m || 
|-id=507 bgcolor=#fefefe
| 260507 ||  || — || March 3, 2005 || Catalina || CSS || FLO || align=right data-sort-value="0.84" | 840 m || 
|-id=508 bgcolor=#fefefe
| 260508 Alagna ||  ||  || March 3, 2005 || Nogales || J.-C. Merlin || — || align=right | 1.1 km || 
|-id=509 bgcolor=#fefefe
| 260509 ||  || — || March 4, 2005 || Kitt Peak || Spacewatch || — || align=right data-sort-value="0.97" | 970 m || 
|-id=510 bgcolor=#fefefe
| 260510 ||  || — || March 4, 2005 || Catalina || CSS || — || align=right | 1.3 km || 
|-id=511 bgcolor=#fefefe
| 260511 ||  || — || March 4, 2005 || Socorro || LINEAR || — || align=right data-sort-value="0.76" | 760 m || 
|-id=512 bgcolor=#fefefe
| 260512 ||  || — || March 4, 2005 || Mount Lemmon || Mount Lemmon Survey || — || align=right data-sort-value="0.97" | 970 m || 
|-id=513 bgcolor=#FA8072
| 260513 ||  || — || March 2, 2005 || Catalina || CSS || — || align=right | 1.1 km || 
|-id=514 bgcolor=#E9E9E9
| 260514 ||  || — || March 3, 2005 || Kitt Peak || Spacewatch || — || align=right | 1.2 km || 
|-id=515 bgcolor=#fefefe
| 260515 ||  || — || March 3, 2005 || Catalina || CSS || FLO || align=right data-sort-value="0.91" | 910 m || 
|-id=516 bgcolor=#fefefe
| 260516 ||  || — || March 4, 2005 || Kitt Peak || Spacewatch || — || align=right data-sort-value="0.90" | 900 m || 
|-id=517 bgcolor=#fefefe
| 260517 ||  || — || March 8, 2005 || Anderson Mesa || LONEOS || — || align=right data-sort-value="0.90" | 900 m || 
|-id=518 bgcolor=#fefefe
| 260518 ||  || — || March 8, 2005 || Anderson Mesa || LONEOS || FLO || align=right data-sort-value="0.88" | 880 m || 
|-id=519 bgcolor=#fefefe
| 260519 ||  || — || March 3, 2005 || Catalina || CSS || — || align=right | 1.0 km || 
|-id=520 bgcolor=#fefefe
| 260520 ||  || — || March 3, 2005 || Catalina || CSS || — || align=right | 1.1 km || 
|-id=521 bgcolor=#fefefe
| 260521 ||  || — || March 3, 2005 || Catalina || CSS || — || align=right | 1.0 km || 
|-id=522 bgcolor=#fefefe
| 260522 ||  || — || March 3, 2005 || Kitt Peak || Spacewatch || — || align=right | 1.1 km || 
|-id=523 bgcolor=#fefefe
| 260523 ||  || — || March 4, 2005 || Catalina || CSS || V || align=right data-sort-value="0.89" | 890 m || 
|-id=524 bgcolor=#fefefe
| 260524 ||  || — || March 4, 2005 || Mount Lemmon || Mount Lemmon Survey || — || align=right data-sort-value="0.99" | 990 m || 
|-id=525 bgcolor=#fefefe
| 260525 ||  || — || March 4, 2005 || Mount Lemmon || Mount Lemmon Survey || — || align=right | 1.0 km || 
|-id=526 bgcolor=#fefefe
| 260526 ||  || — || March 7, 2005 || La Silla || R. Gauderon, R. Behrend || NYS || align=right | 2.0 km || 
|-id=527 bgcolor=#fefefe
| 260527 ||  || — || March 8, 2005 || Anderson Mesa || LONEOS || — || align=right | 1.0 km || 
|-id=528 bgcolor=#fefefe
| 260528 ||  || — || March 8, 2005 || Mount Lemmon || Mount Lemmon Survey || FLO || align=right data-sort-value="0.84" | 840 m || 
|-id=529 bgcolor=#fefefe
| 260529 ||  || — || March 9, 2005 || Anderson Mesa || LONEOS || FLO || align=right data-sort-value="0.60" | 600 m || 
|-id=530 bgcolor=#fefefe
| 260530 ||  || — || March 9, 2005 || Socorro || LINEAR || NYS || align=right data-sort-value="0.82" | 820 m || 
|-id=531 bgcolor=#fefefe
| 260531 ||  || — || March 9, 2005 || Mount Lemmon || Mount Lemmon Survey || NYS || align=right data-sort-value="0.88" | 880 m || 
|-id=532 bgcolor=#fefefe
| 260532 ||  || — || March 10, 2005 || Mount Lemmon || Mount Lemmon Survey || FLO || align=right data-sort-value="0.79" | 790 m || 
|-id=533 bgcolor=#fefefe
| 260533 ||  || — || March 10, 2005 || Catalina || CSS || FLO || align=right data-sort-value="0.99" | 990 m || 
|-id=534 bgcolor=#fefefe
| 260534 ||  || — || March 10, 2005 || Mount Lemmon || Mount Lemmon Survey || FLO || align=right data-sort-value="0.72" | 720 m || 
|-id=535 bgcolor=#E9E9E9
| 260535 ||  || — || March 10, 2005 || Kitt Peak || Spacewatch || — || align=right | 2.2 km || 
|-id=536 bgcolor=#fefefe
| 260536 ||  || — || March 10, 2005 || Kitt Peak || Spacewatch || FLO || align=right data-sort-value="0.94" | 940 m || 
|-id=537 bgcolor=#E9E9E9
| 260537 ||  || — || March 10, 2005 || Kitt Peak || Spacewatch || — || align=right | 1.3 km || 
|-id=538 bgcolor=#fefefe
| 260538 ||  || — || March 10, 2005 || Kitt Peak || Spacewatch || — || align=right data-sort-value="0.90" | 900 m || 
|-id=539 bgcolor=#E9E9E9
| 260539 ||  || — || March 7, 2005 || Socorro || LINEAR || JUN || align=right | 1.5 km || 
|-id=540 bgcolor=#fefefe
| 260540 ||  || — || March 8, 2005 || Mount Lemmon || Mount Lemmon Survey || NYS || align=right data-sort-value="0.79" | 790 m || 
|-id=541 bgcolor=#fefefe
| 260541 ||  || — || March 9, 2005 || Mount Lemmon || Mount Lemmon Survey || EUT || align=right data-sort-value="0.96" | 960 m || 
|-id=542 bgcolor=#E9E9E9
| 260542 ||  || — || March 9, 2005 || Mount Lemmon || Mount Lemmon Survey || — || align=right | 1.0 km || 
|-id=543 bgcolor=#fefefe
| 260543 ||  || — || March 11, 2005 || Kitt Peak || Spacewatch || — || align=right | 1.1 km || 
|-id=544 bgcolor=#fefefe
| 260544 ||  || — || March 8, 2005 || Mount Lemmon || Mount Lemmon Survey || NYS || align=right data-sort-value="0.82" | 820 m || 
|-id=545 bgcolor=#d6d6d6
| 260545 ||  || — || March 9, 2005 || Mount Lemmon || Mount Lemmon Survey || — || align=right | 4.7 km || 
|-id=546 bgcolor=#fefefe
| 260546 ||  || — || March 9, 2005 || Socorro || LINEAR || — || align=right | 1.1 km || 
|-id=547 bgcolor=#fefefe
| 260547 ||  || — || March 9, 2005 || Anderson Mesa || LONEOS || — || align=right | 1.4 km || 
|-id=548 bgcolor=#fefefe
| 260548 ||  || — || March 9, 2005 || Kitt Peak || Spacewatch || V || align=right data-sort-value="0.73" | 730 m || 
|-id=549 bgcolor=#E9E9E9
| 260549 ||  || — || March 9, 2005 || Siding Spring || SSS || MIT || align=right | 2.5 km || 
|-id=550 bgcolor=#fefefe
| 260550 ||  || — || March 10, 2005 || Mount Lemmon || Mount Lemmon Survey || — || align=right data-sort-value="0.85" | 850 m || 
|-id=551 bgcolor=#fefefe
| 260551 ||  || — || March 10, 2005 || Mount Lemmon || Mount Lemmon Survey || NYS || align=right data-sort-value="0.77" | 770 m || 
|-id=552 bgcolor=#fefefe
| 260552 ||  || — || March 10, 2005 || Mount Lemmon || Mount Lemmon Survey || V || align=right data-sort-value="0.79" | 790 m || 
|-id=553 bgcolor=#fefefe
| 260553 ||  || — || March 11, 2005 || Mount Lemmon || Mount Lemmon Survey || — || align=right data-sort-value="0.78" | 780 m || 
|-id=554 bgcolor=#fefefe
| 260554 ||  || — || March 12, 2005 || Socorro || LINEAR || V || align=right data-sort-value="0.84" | 840 m || 
|-id=555 bgcolor=#fefefe
| 260555 ||  || — || March 12, 2005 || Kitt Peak || Spacewatch || — || align=right data-sort-value="0.89" | 890 m || 
|-id=556 bgcolor=#E9E9E9
| 260556 ||  || — || March 12, 2005 || Anderson Mesa || LONEOS || MIT || align=right | 3.9 km || 
|-id=557 bgcolor=#fefefe
| 260557 ||  || — || March 11, 2005 || Mount Lemmon || Mount Lemmon Survey || NYS || align=right data-sort-value="0.82" | 820 m || 
|-id=558 bgcolor=#fefefe
| 260558 ||  || — || March 4, 2005 || Catalina || CSS || FLO || align=right data-sort-value="0.76" | 760 m || 
|-id=559 bgcolor=#fefefe
| 260559 ||  || — || March 4, 2005 || Catalina || CSS || — || align=right | 1.1 km || 
|-id=560 bgcolor=#fefefe
| 260560 ||  || — || March 4, 2005 || Socorro || LINEAR || FLO || align=right data-sort-value="0.85" | 850 m || 
|-id=561 bgcolor=#fefefe
| 260561 ||  || — || March 4, 2005 || Socorro || LINEAR || V || align=right data-sort-value="0.89" | 890 m || 
|-id=562 bgcolor=#fefefe
| 260562 ||  || — || March 4, 2005 || Socorro || LINEAR || — || align=right data-sort-value="0.92" | 920 m || 
|-id=563 bgcolor=#fefefe
| 260563 ||  || — || March 9, 2005 || Anderson Mesa || LONEOS || — || align=right | 1.0 km || 
|-id=564 bgcolor=#fefefe
| 260564 ||  || — || March 11, 2005 || Kitt Peak || Spacewatch || — || align=right data-sort-value="0.84" | 840 m || 
|-id=565 bgcolor=#fefefe
| 260565 ||  || — || March 12, 2005 || Kitt Peak || Spacewatch || — || align=right data-sort-value="0.96" | 960 m || 
|-id=566 bgcolor=#fefefe
| 260566 ||  || — || March 11, 2005 || Kitt Peak || Spacewatch || — || align=right data-sort-value="0.85" | 850 m || 
|-id=567 bgcolor=#E9E9E9
| 260567 ||  || — || March 10, 2005 || Anderson Mesa || LONEOS || JUN || align=right | 2.4 km || 
|-id=568 bgcolor=#fefefe
| 260568 ||  || — || March 11, 2005 || Mount Lemmon || Mount Lemmon Survey || NYS || align=right data-sort-value="0.70" | 700 m || 
|-id=569 bgcolor=#fefefe
| 260569 ||  || — || March 11, 2005 || Mount Lemmon || Mount Lemmon Survey || — || align=right data-sort-value="0.69" | 690 m || 
|-id=570 bgcolor=#fefefe
| 260570 ||  || — || March 13, 2005 || Kitt Peak || Spacewatch || — || align=right data-sort-value="0.94" | 940 m || 
|-id=571 bgcolor=#fefefe
| 260571 ||  || — || March 13, 2005 || Kitt Peak || Spacewatch || FLO || align=right data-sort-value="0.84" | 840 m || 
|-id=572 bgcolor=#fefefe
| 260572 ||  || — || March 13, 2005 || Mount Lemmon || Mount Lemmon Survey || — || align=right data-sort-value="0.89" | 890 m || 
|-id=573 bgcolor=#fefefe
| 260573 ||  || — || March 13, 2005 || Catalina || CSS || NYS || align=right data-sort-value="0.77" | 770 m || 
|-id=574 bgcolor=#fefefe
| 260574 ||  || — || March 13, 2005 || Kitt Peak || Spacewatch || — || align=right | 1.2 km || 
|-id=575 bgcolor=#fefefe
| 260575 ||  || — || March 14, 2005 || Mount Lemmon || Mount Lemmon Survey || NYS || align=right data-sort-value="0.78" | 780 m || 
|-id=576 bgcolor=#E9E9E9
| 260576 ||  || — || March 14, 2005 || Mount Lemmon || Mount Lemmon Survey || — || align=right | 1.1 km || 
|-id=577 bgcolor=#E9E9E9
| 260577 ||  || — || March 15, 2005 || Mount Lemmon || Mount Lemmon Survey || — || align=right | 1.3 km || 
|-id=578 bgcolor=#fefefe
| 260578 ||  || — || March 12, 2005 || Socorro || LINEAR || FLO || align=right data-sort-value="0.87" | 870 m || 
|-id=579 bgcolor=#fefefe
| 260579 ||  || — || March 11, 2005 || Kitt Peak || Spacewatch || — || align=right data-sort-value="0.89" | 890 m || 
|-id=580 bgcolor=#fefefe
| 260580 ||  || — || March 8, 2005 || Anderson Mesa || LONEOS || — || align=right data-sort-value="0.86" | 860 m || 
|-id=581 bgcolor=#fefefe
| 260581 ||  || — || March 8, 2005 || Anderson Mesa || LONEOS || NYS || align=right data-sort-value="0.94" | 940 m || 
|-id=582 bgcolor=#fefefe
| 260582 ||  || — || March 9, 2005 || Kitt Peak || Spacewatch || — || align=right | 1.3 km || 
|-id=583 bgcolor=#fefefe
| 260583 ||  || — || March 11, 2005 || Kitt Peak || Spacewatch || NYS || align=right data-sort-value="0.77" | 770 m || 
|-id=584 bgcolor=#fefefe
| 260584 ||  || — || March 13, 2005 || Kitt Peak || Spacewatch || NYS || align=right data-sort-value="0.79" | 790 m || 
|-id=585 bgcolor=#fefefe
| 260585 ||  || — || March 5, 2005 || Wise || Wise Obs. || MAS || align=right data-sort-value="0.90" | 900 m || 
|-id=586 bgcolor=#fefefe
| 260586 ||  || — || March 10, 2005 || Catalina || CSS || — || align=right | 1.1 km || 
|-id=587 bgcolor=#fefefe
| 260587 ||  || — || March 8, 2005 || Mount Lemmon || Mount Lemmon Survey || NYS || align=right data-sort-value="0.88" | 880 m || 
|-id=588 bgcolor=#fefefe
| 260588 ||  || — || March 8, 2005 || Mount Lemmon || Mount Lemmon Survey || — || align=right data-sort-value="0.85" | 850 m || 
|-id=589 bgcolor=#fefefe
| 260589 ||  || — || March 10, 2005 || Mount Lemmon || Mount Lemmon Survey || — || align=right data-sort-value="0.79" | 790 m || 
|-id=590 bgcolor=#fefefe
| 260590 ||  || — || March 10, 2005 || Kitt Peak || M. W. Buie || — || align=right data-sort-value="0.82" | 820 m || 
|-id=591 bgcolor=#E9E9E9
| 260591 ||  || — || March 11, 2005 || Mount Lemmon || Mount Lemmon Survey || — || align=right | 1.1 km || 
|-id=592 bgcolor=#fefefe
| 260592 ||  || — || March 12, 2005 || Kitt Peak || Spacewatch || — || align=right data-sort-value="0.88" | 880 m || 
|-id=593 bgcolor=#fefefe
| 260593 ||  || — || March 18, 2005 || Catalina || CSS || — || align=right | 1.4 km || 
|-id=594 bgcolor=#fefefe
| 260594 ||  || — || March 30, 2005 || Catalina || CSS || V || align=right data-sort-value="0.96" | 960 m || 
|-id=595 bgcolor=#E9E9E9
| 260595 ||  || — || March 30, 2005 || Catalina || CSS || — || align=right | 2.3 km || 
|-id=596 bgcolor=#fefefe
| 260596 ||  || — || March 16, 2005 || Catalina || CSS || FLO || align=right | 1.0 km || 
|-id=597 bgcolor=#fefefe
| 260597 ||  || — || March 31, 2005 || Kitt Peak || Spacewatch || — || align=right | 1.1 km || 
|-id=598 bgcolor=#fefefe
| 260598 ||  || — || April 1, 2005 || Catalina || CSS || — || align=right | 1.4 km || 
|-id=599 bgcolor=#E9E9E9
| 260599 ||  || — || April 1, 2005 || Kitt Peak || Spacewatch || — || align=right | 2.2 km || 
|-id=600 bgcolor=#fefefe
| 260600 ||  || — || April 1, 2005 || Kitt Peak || Spacewatch || FLO || align=right data-sort-value="0.81" | 810 m || 
|}

260601–260700 

|-bgcolor=#fefefe
| 260601 Wesselényi ||  ||  || April 2, 2005 || Piszkéstető || K. Sárneczky || — || align=right data-sort-value="0.58" | 580 m || 
|-id=602 bgcolor=#fefefe
| 260602 ||  || — || April 1, 2005 || Kitt Peak || Spacewatch || MAS || align=right | 1.1 km || 
|-id=603 bgcolor=#fefefe
| 260603 ||  || — || April 1, 2005 || Anderson Mesa || LONEOS || — || align=right | 1.1 km || 
|-id=604 bgcolor=#fefefe
| 260604 ||  || — || April 1, 2005 || Anderson Mesa || LONEOS || NYS || align=right | 1.1 km || 
|-id=605 bgcolor=#fefefe
| 260605 ||  || — || April 2, 2005 || Mount Lemmon || Mount Lemmon Survey || — || align=right data-sort-value="0.79" | 790 m || 
|-id=606 bgcolor=#fefefe
| 260606 ||  || — || April 2, 2005 || Palomar || NEAT || — || align=right data-sort-value="0.77" | 770 m || 
|-id=607 bgcolor=#fefefe
| 260607 ||  || — || April 2, 2005 || Palomar || NEAT || NYS || align=right data-sort-value="0.75" | 750 m || 
|-id=608 bgcolor=#E9E9E9
| 260608 ||  || — || April 2, 2005 || Mount Lemmon || Mount Lemmon Survey || — || align=right | 1.2 km || 
|-id=609 bgcolor=#fefefe
| 260609 ||  || — || April 2, 2005 || Anderson Mesa || LONEOS || — || align=right data-sort-value="0.79" | 790 m || 
|-id=610 bgcolor=#fefefe
| 260610 ||  || — || April 1, 2005 || Kitt Peak || Spacewatch || ERI || align=right | 2.3 km || 
|-id=611 bgcolor=#fefefe
| 260611 ||  || — || April 2, 2005 || Mount Lemmon || Mount Lemmon Survey || — || align=right data-sort-value="0.65" | 650 m || 
|-id=612 bgcolor=#fefefe
| 260612 ||  || — || April 4, 2005 || Kitt Peak || Spacewatch || NYS || align=right data-sort-value="0.81" | 810 m || 
|-id=613 bgcolor=#d6d6d6
| 260613 ||  || — || April 4, 2005 || Mount Lemmon || Mount Lemmon Survey || HIL3:2 || align=right | 9.0 km || 
|-id=614 bgcolor=#fefefe
| 260614 ||  || — || April 4, 2005 || Catalina || CSS || V || align=right data-sort-value="0.92" | 920 m || 
|-id=615 bgcolor=#E9E9E9
| 260615 ||  || — || April 2, 2005 || Mount Lemmon || Mount Lemmon Survey || HEN || align=right | 1.4 km || 
|-id=616 bgcolor=#fefefe
| 260616 ||  || — || April 4, 2005 || Mount Lemmon || Mount Lemmon Survey || NYS || align=right data-sort-value="0.72" | 720 m || 
|-id=617 bgcolor=#fefefe
| 260617 ||  || — || April 5, 2005 || Mount Lemmon || Mount Lemmon Survey || FLO || align=right data-sort-value="0.73" | 730 m || 
|-id=618 bgcolor=#fefefe
| 260618 ||  || — || April 5, 2005 || Mount Lemmon || Mount Lemmon Survey || — || align=right data-sort-value="0.80" | 800 m || 
|-id=619 bgcolor=#fefefe
| 260619 ||  || — || April 5, 2005 || Mount Lemmon || Mount Lemmon Survey || — || align=right | 1.0 km || 
|-id=620 bgcolor=#fefefe
| 260620 ||  || — || April 5, 2005 || Mount Lemmon || Mount Lemmon Survey || NYS || align=right data-sort-value="0.69" | 690 m || 
|-id=621 bgcolor=#fefefe
| 260621 ||  || — || April 1, 2005 || Anderson Mesa || LONEOS || — || align=right data-sort-value="0.87" | 870 m || 
|-id=622 bgcolor=#fefefe
| 260622 ||  || — || April 2, 2005 || Catalina || CSS || FLO || align=right data-sort-value="0.87" | 870 m || 
|-id=623 bgcolor=#fefefe
| 260623 ||  || — || April 4, 2005 || Mount Lemmon || Mount Lemmon Survey || — || align=right | 1.2 km || 
|-id=624 bgcolor=#E9E9E9
| 260624 ||  || — || April 4, 2005 || Catalina || CSS || — || align=right | 2.4 km || 
|-id=625 bgcolor=#fefefe
| 260625 ||  || — || April 5, 2005 || Catalina || CSS || NYS || align=right | 1.0 km || 
|-id=626 bgcolor=#fefefe
| 260626 ||  || — || April 5, 2005 || Socorro || LINEAR || — || align=right | 1.3 km || 
|-id=627 bgcolor=#E9E9E9
| 260627 ||  || — || April 5, 2005 || Mount Lemmon || Mount Lemmon Survey || — || align=right | 1.8 km || 
|-id=628 bgcolor=#E9E9E9
| 260628 ||  || — || April 6, 2005 || Catalina || CSS || — || align=right | 3.6 km || 
|-id=629 bgcolor=#fefefe
| 260629 ||  || — || April 7, 2005 || Kitt Peak || Spacewatch || FLO || align=right data-sort-value="0.82" | 820 m || 
|-id=630 bgcolor=#fefefe
| 260630 ||  || — || April 6, 2005 || Kitt Peak || Spacewatch || MAS || align=right data-sort-value="0.92" | 920 m || 
|-id=631 bgcolor=#fefefe
| 260631 ||  || — || April 6, 2005 || Kitt Peak || Spacewatch || — || align=right data-sort-value="0.68" | 680 m || 
|-id=632 bgcolor=#fefefe
| 260632 ||  || — || April 10, 2005 || Kitt Peak || Spacewatch || NYS || align=right data-sort-value="0.63" | 630 m || 
|-id=633 bgcolor=#E9E9E9
| 260633 ||  || — || April 10, 2005 || Kitt Peak || Spacewatch || — || align=right | 1.7 km || 
|-id=634 bgcolor=#E9E9E9
| 260634 ||  || — || April 10, 2005 || Siding Spring || SSS || JUN || align=right | 1.6 km || 
|-id=635 bgcolor=#E9E9E9
| 260635 ||  || — || April 9, 2005 || Socorro || LINEAR || — || align=right | 1.5 km || 
|-id=636 bgcolor=#E9E9E9
| 260636 ||  || — || April 11, 2005 || Socorro || LINEAR || — || align=right | 1.9 km || 
|-id=637 bgcolor=#E9E9E9
| 260637 ||  || — || April 6, 2005 || Mount Lemmon || Mount Lemmon Survey || — || align=right | 1.2 km || 
|-id=638 bgcolor=#fefefe
| 260638 ||  || — || April 11, 2005 || Kitt Peak || Spacewatch || — || align=right data-sort-value="0.93" | 930 m || 
|-id=639 bgcolor=#fefefe
| 260639 ||  || — || April 11, 2005 || Mount Lemmon || Mount Lemmon Survey || NYS || align=right data-sort-value="0.63" | 630 m || 
|-id=640 bgcolor=#E9E9E9
| 260640 ||  || — || April 7, 2005 || Palomar || NEAT || — || align=right | 1.4 km || 
|-id=641 bgcolor=#E9E9E9
| 260641 ||  || — || April 8, 2005 || Socorro || LINEAR || — || align=right | 3.4 km || 
|-id=642 bgcolor=#E9E9E9
| 260642 ||  || — || April 10, 2005 || Kitt Peak || Spacewatch || — || align=right | 2.1 km || 
|-id=643 bgcolor=#fefefe
| 260643 ||  || — || April 10, 2005 || Kitt Peak || Spacewatch || V || align=right data-sort-value="0.82" | 820 m || 
|-id=644 bgcolor=#fefefe
| 260644 ||  || — || April 10, 2005 || Kitt Peak || Spacewatch || V || align=right data-sort-value="0.92" | 920 m || 
|-id=645 bgcolor=#fefefe
| 260645 ||  || — || April 11, 2005 || Mount Lemmon || Mount Lemmon Survey || V || align=right data-sort-value="0.71" | 710 m || 
|-id=646 bgcolor=#fefefe
| 260646 ||  || — || April 11, 2005 || Kitt Peak || Spacewatch || — || align=right data-sort-value="0.94" | 940 m || 
|-id=647 bgcolor=#fefefe
| 260647 ||  || — || April 12, 2005 || Kitt Peak || Spacewatch || — || align=right | 1.2 km || 
|-id=648 bgcolor=#E9E9E9
| 260648 ||  || — || April 10, 2005 || Kitt Peak || Spacewatch || — || align=right | 1.4 km || 
|-id=649 bgcolor=#fefefe
| 260649 ||  || — || April 10, 2005 || Siding Spring || SSS || CHL || align=right | 2.4 km || 
|-id=650 bgcolor=#fefefe
| 260650 ||  || — || April 11, 2005 || Kitt Peak || Spacewatch || NYS || align=right data-sort-value="0.66" | 660 m || 
|-id=651 bgcolor=#fefefe
| 260651 ||  || — || April 11, 2005 || Kitt Peak || Spacewatch || NYS || align=right data-sort-value="0.94" | 940 m || 
|-id=652 bgcolor=#fefefe
| 260652 ||  || — || April 13, 2005 || Anderson Mesa || LONEOS || FLO || align=right data-sort-value="0.79" | 790 m || 
|-id=653 bgcolor=#fefefe
| 260653 ||  || — || April 13, 2005 || Catalina || CSS || — || align=right | 1.4 km || 
|-id=654 bgcolor=#fefefe
| 260654 ||  || — || April 13, 2005 || Catalina || CSS || — || align=right | 1.2 km || 
|-id=655 bgcolor=#fefefe
| 260655 ||  || — || April 11, 2005 || Mount Lemmon || Mount Lemmon Survey || V || align=right data-sort-value="0.74" | 740 m || 
|-id=656 bgcolor=#fefefe
| 260656 ||  || — || April 12, 2005 || Kitt Peak || Spacewatch || NYS || align=right data-sort-value="0.80" | 800 m || 
|-id=657 bgcolor=#E9E9E9
| 260657 ||  || — || April 13, 2005 || Kitt Peak || Spacewatch || — || align=right | 1.2 km || 
|-id=658 bgcolor=#fefefe
| 260658 ||  || — || April 12, 2005 || Kitt Peak || Spacewatch || MAS || align=right data-sort-value="0.95" | 950 m || 
|-id=659 bgcolor=#fefefe
| 260659 ||  || — || April 2, 2005 || Kitt Peak || Spacewatch || — || align=right data-sort-value="0.92" | 920 m || 
|-id=660 bgcolor=#E9E9E9
| 260660 ||  || — || April 1, 2005 || Anderson Mesa || LONEOS || — || align=right | 2.1 km || 
|-id=661 bgcolor=#E9E9E9
| 260661 ||  || — || April 16, 2005 || Kitt Peak || Spacewatch || JUN || align=right | 1.1 km || 
|-id=662 bgcolor=#fefefe
| 260662 ||  || — || April 30, 2005 || Kitt Peak || Spacewatch || — || align=right | 1.3 km || 
|-id=663 bgcolor=#fefefe
| 260663 ||  || — || April 30, 2005 || Kitt Peak || Spacewatch || — || align=right | 1.1 km || 
|-id=664 bgcolor=#fefefe
| 260664 ||  || — || April 17, 2005 || Kitt Peak || Spacewatch || — || align=right | 1.0 km || 
|-id=665 bgcolor=#E9E9E9
| 260665 ||  || — || May 1, 2005 || Kitt Peak || Spacewatch || EUN || align=right | 1.7 km || 
|-id=666 bgcolor=#fefefe
| 260666 ||  || — || May 3, 2005 || Socorro || LINEAR || — || align=right data-sort-value="0.89" | 890 m || 
|-id=667 bgcolor=#fefefe
| 260667 ||  || — || May 3, 2005 || Catalina || CSS || — || align=right | 1.1 km || 
|-id=668 bgcolor=#fefefe
| 260668 ||  || — || May 3, 2005 || Catalina || CSS || NYS || align=right data-sort-value="0.85" | 850 m || 
|-id=669 bgcolor=#fefefe
| 260669 ||  || — || May 4, 2005 || Mauna Kea || C. Veillet || V || align=right data-sort-value="0.75" | 750 m || 
|-id=670 bgcolor=#fefefe
| 260670 ||  || — || May 4, 2005 || Mauna Kea || C. Veillet || MAS || align=right data-sort-value="0.84" | 840 m || 
|-id=671 bgcolor=#fefefe
| 260671 ||  || — || May 6, 2005 || Mount Lemmon || Mount Lemmon Survey || NYS || align=right data-sort-value="0.71" | 710 m || 
|-id=672 bgcolor=#E9E9E9
| 260672 ||  || — || May 4, 2005 || Mount Lemmon || Mount Lemmon Survey || — || align=right | 1.9 km || 
|-id=673 bgcolor=#E9E9E9
| 260673 ||  || — || May 4, 2005 || Siding Spring || SSS || — || align=right | 1.9 km || 
|-id=674 bgcolor=#fefefe
| 260674 ||  || — || May 8, 2005 || Kitt Peak || Spacewatch || — || align=right data-sort-value="0.98" | 980 m || 
|-id=675 bgcolor=#fefefe
| 260675 ||  || — || May 8, 2005 || Mount Lemmon || Mount Lemmon Survey || — || align=right | 1.2 km || 
|-id=676 bgcolor=#E9E9E9
| 260676 Evethuriere ||  ||  || May 8, 2005 || Saint-Sulpice || B. Christophe || — || align=right | 1.1 km || 
|-id=677 bgcolor=#fefefe
| 260677 ||  || — || May 4, 2005 || Kitt Peak || Spacewatch || — || align=right | 1.2 km || 
|-id=678 bgcolor=#E9E9E9
| 260678 ||  || — || May 6, 2005 || Kitt Peak || Spacewatch || — || align=right | 1.9 km || 
|-id=679 bgcolor=#fefefe
| 260679 ||  || — || May 7, 2005 || Kitt Peak || Spacewatch || — || align=right data-sort-value="0.84" | 840 m || 
|-id=680 bgcolor=#fefefe
| 260680 ||  || — || May 8, 2005 || Mount Lemmon || Mount Lemmon Survey || — || align=right | 1.1 km || 
|-id=681 bgcolor=#fefefe
| 260681 ||  || — || May 8, 2005 || Kitt Peak || Spacewatch || V || align=right data-sort-value="0.78" | 780 m || 
|-id=682 bgcolor=#E9E9E9
| 260682 ||  || — || May 9, 2005 || Mount Lemmon || Mount Lemmon Survey || — || align=right | 1.2 km || 
|-id=683 bgcolor=#fefefe
| 260683 ||  || — || May 4, 2005 || Palomar || NEAT || FLO || align=right | 1.0 km || 
|-id=684 bgcolor=#fefefe
| 260684 ||  || — || May 8, 2005 || Catalina || CSS || — || align=right data-sort-value="0.83" | 830 m || 
|-id=685 bgcolor=#fefefe
| 260685 ||  || — || May 10, 2005 || Mount Lemmon || Mount Lemmon Survey || — || align=right data-sort-value="0.95" | 950 m || 
|-id=686 bgcolor=#fefefe
| 260686 ||  || — || May 10, 2005 || Socorro || LINEAR || — || align=right data-sort-value="0.89" | 890 m || 
|-id=687 bgcolor=#E9E9E9
| 260687 ||  || — || May 10, 2005 || Mount Lemmon || Mount Lemmon Survey || — || align=right | 1.8 km || 
|-id=688 bgcolor=#E9E9E9
| 260688 ||  || — || May 11, 2005 || Palomar || NEAT || MAR || align=right | 1.1 km || 
|-id=689 bgcolor=#E9E9E9
| 260689 ||  || — || May 11, 2005 || Palomar || NEAT || — || align=right | 1.7 km || 
|-id=690 bgcolor=#fefefe
| 260690 ||  || — || May 8, 2005 || Kitt Peak || Spacewatch || — || align=right | 1.1 km || 
|-id=691 bgcolor=#fefefe
| 260691 ||  || — || May 8, 2005 || Kitt Peak || Spacewatch || — || align=right | 1.2 km || 
|-id=692 bgcolor=#fefefe
| 260692 ||  || — || May 9, 2005 || Anderson Mesa || LONEOS || MAS || align=right data-sort-value="0.82" | 820 m || 
|-id=693 bgcolor=#E9E9E9
| 260693 ||  || — || May 9, 2005 || Kitt Peak || Spacewatch || — || align=right | 1.8 km || 
|-id=694 bgcolor=#fefefe
| 260694 ||  || — || May 11, 2005 || Mount Lemmon || Mount Lemmon Survey || — || align=right | 1.2 km || 
|-id=695 bgcolor=#fefefe
| 260695 ||  || — || May 12, 2005 || Kitt Peak || Spacewatch || V || align=right data-sort-value="0.89" | 890 m || 
|-id=696 bgcolor=#fefefe
| 260696 ||  || — || May 9, 2005 || Anderson Mesa || LONEOS || V || align=right data-sort-value="0.97" | 970 m || 
|-id=697 bgcolor=#fefefe
| 260697 ||  || — || May 9, 2005 || Anderson Mesa || LONEOS || — || align=right data-sort-value="0.96" | 960 m || 
|-id=698 bgcolor=#fefefe
| 260698 ||  || — || May 10, 2005 || Kitt Peak || Spacewatch || V || align=right data-sort-value="0.93" | 930 m || 
|-id=699 bgcolor=#E9E9E9
| 260699 ||  || — || May 10, 2005 || Kitt Peak || Spacewatch || NEM || align=right | 2.8 km || 
|-id=700 bgcolor=#fefefe
| 260700 ||  || — || May 10, 2005 || Kitt Peak || Spacewatch || — || align=right | 1.1 km || 
|}

260701–260800 

|-bgcolor=#C2FFFF
| 260701 ||  || — || May 10, 2005 || Kitt Peak || Spacewatch || L4 || align=right | 12 km || 
|-id=702 bgcolor=#fefefe
| 260702 ||  || — || May 10, 2005 || Kitt Peak || Spacewatch || — || align=right | 1.1 km || 
|-id=703 bgcolor=#fefefe
| 260703 ||  || — || May 12, 2005 || Catalina || CSS || — || align=right | 1.9 km || 
|-id=704 bgcolor=#fefefe
| 260704 ||  || — || May 13, 2005 || Kitt Peak || Spacewatch || NYS || align=right data-sort-value="0.65" | 650 m || 
|-id=705 bgcolor=#E9E9E9
| 260705 ||  || — || May 14, 2005 || Kitt Peak || Spacewatch || — || align=right | 1.7 km || 
|-id=706 bgcolor=#fefefe
| 260706 ||  || — || May 14, 2005 || Kitt Peak || Spacewatch || V || align=right data-sort-value="0.89" | 890 m || 
|-id=707 bgcolor=#fefefe
| 260707 ||  || — || May 12, 2005 || Kitt Peak || Spacewatch || — || align=right data-sort-value="0.85" | 850 m || 
|-id=708 bgcolor=#fefefe
| 260708 ||  || — || May 15, 2005 || Mount Lemmon || Mount Lemmon Survey || — || align=right | 1.4 km || 
|-id=709 bgcolor=#E9E9E9
| 260709 ||  || — || May 15, 2005 || Mount Lemmon || Mount Lemmon Survey || ADE || align=right | 3.2 km || 
|-id=710 bgcolor=#fefefe
| 260710 ||  || — || May 15, 2005 || Mount Lemmon || Mount Lemmon Survey || — || align=right | 1.1 km || 
|-id=711 bgcolor=#E9E9E9
| 260711 ||  || — || May 13, 2005 || Kitt Peak || Spacewatch || — || align=right | 2.4 km || 
|-id=712 bgcolor=#fefefe
| 260712 ||  || — || May 3, 2005 || Kitt Peak || Spacewatch || V || align=right data-sort-value="0.72" | 720 m || 
|-id=713 bgcolor=#E9E9E9
| 260713 ||  || — || May 4, 2005 || Catalina || CSS || — || align=right | 1.4 km || 
|-id=714 bgcolor=#E9E9E9
| 260714 ||  || — || May 6, 2005 || Catalina || CSS || — || align=right | 2.3 km || 
|-id=715 bgcolor=#E9E9E9
| 260715 ||  || — || May 9, 2005 || Kitt Peak || Spacewatch || — || align=right | 1.5 km || 
|-id=716 bgcolor=#E9E9E9
| 260716 ||  || — || May 11, 2005 || Palomar || NEAT || — || align=right | 2.4 km || 
|-id=717 bgcolor=#E9E9E9
| 260717 ||  || — || May 11, 2005 || Palomar || NEAT || — || align=right | 1.8 km || 
|-id=718 bgcolor=#fefefe
| 260718 ||  || — || May 13, 2005 || Siding Spring || SSS || — || align=right | 1.5 km || 
|-id=719 bgcolor=#E9E9E9
| 260719 ||  || — || May 14, 2005 || Palomar || NEAT || — || align=right | 1.1 km || 
|-id=720 bgcolor=#E9E9E9
| 260720 ||  || — || May 3, 2005 || Kitt Peak || Spacewatch || — || align=right | 1.2 km || 
|-id=721 bgcolor=#E9E9E9
| 260721 ||  || — || May 16, 2005 || Mount Lemmon || Mount Lemmon Survey || — || align=right | 1.8 km || 
|-id=722 bgcolor=#fefefe
| 260722 ||  || — || May 17, 2005 || Mount Lemmon || Mount Lemmon Survey || — || align=right | 1.0 km || 
|-id=723 bgcolor=#fefefe
| 260723 ||  || — || May 16, 2005 || Kitt Peak || Spacewatch || — || align=right data-sort-value="0.99" | 990 m || 
|-id=724 bgcolor=#fefefe
| 260724 Malherbe ||  ||  || May 30, 2005 || Saint-Sulpice || Saint-Sulpice Obs. || V || align=right data-sort-value="0.92" | 920 m || 
|-id=725 bgcolor=#E9E9E9
| 260725 ||  || — || May 29, 2005 || Campo Imperatore || CINEOS || RAF || align=right | 1.3 km || 
|-id=726 bgcolor=#C2FFFF
| 260726 ||  || — || June 1, 2005 || Kitt Peak || Spacewatch || L4 || align=right | 11 km || 
|-id=727 bgcolor=#fefefe
| 260727 ||  || — || June 2, 2005 || Catalina || CSS || FLO || align=right data-sort-value="0.89" | 890 m || 
|-id=728 bgcolor=#fefefe
| 260728 ||  || — || June 1, 2005 || Kitt Peak || Spacewatch || — || align=right | 1.2 km || 
|-id=729 bgcolor=#E9E9E9
| 260729 ||  || — || June 1, 2005 || Kitt Peak || Spacewatch || — || align=right | 1.6 km || 
|-id=730 bgcolor=#fefefe
| 260730 ||  || — || June 3, 2005 || Kitt Peak || Spacewatch || FLO || align=right data-sort-value="0.71" | 710 m || 
|-id=731 bgcolor=#E9E9E9
| 260731 ||  || — || June 2, 2005 || Anderson Mesa || LONEOS || — || align=right | 2.8 km || 
|-id=732 bgcolor=#E9E9E9
| 260732 ||  || — || June 8, 2005 || Kitt Peak || Spacewatch || — || align=right | 2.0 km || 
|-id=733 bgcolor=#E9E9E9
| 260733 ||  || — || June 6, 2005 || Socorro || LINEAR || — || align=right | 2.1 km || 
|-id=734 bgcolor=#fefefe
| 260734 ||  || — || June 8, 2005 || Kitt Peak || Spacewatch || PHO || align=right | 1.7 km || 
|-id=735 bgcolor=#fefefe
| 260735 ||  || — || June 10, 2005 || Kitt Peak || Spacewatch || — || align=right | 1.0 km || 
|-id=736 bgcolor=#E9E9E9
| 260736 ||  || — || June 9, 2005 || Kitt Peak || Spacewatch || KON || align=right | 2.6 km || 
|-id=737 bgcolor=#fefefe
| 260737 ||  || — || June 12, 2005 || Kitt Peak || Spacewatch || — || align=right | 1.4 km || 
|-id=738 bgcolor=#E9E9E9
| 260738 ||  || — || June 14, 2005 || Kitt Peak || Spacewatch || BRG || align=right | 2.0 km || 
|-id=739 bgcolor=#fefefe
| 260739 ||  || — || June 10, 2005 || Kitt Peak || Spacewatch || — || align=right | 1.1 km || 
|-id=740 bgcolor=#fefefe
| 260740 ||  || — || June 13, 2005 || Mount Lemmon || Mount Lemmon Survey || — || align=right | 1.2 km || 
|-id=741 bgcolor=#E9E9E9
| 260741 ||  || — || June 13, 2005 || Kitt Peak || Spacewatch || WAT || align=right | 1.8 km || 
|-id=742 bgcolor=#E9E9E9
| 260742 ||  || — || June 13, 2005 || Kitt Peak || Spacewatch || — || align=right | 2.0 km || 
|-id=743 bgcolor=#E9E9E9
| 260743 ||  || — || June 10, 2005 || Kitt Peak || Spacewatch || — || align=right | 2.9 km || 
|-id=744 bgcolor=#E9E9E9
| 260744 ||  || — || June 8, 2005 || Kitt Peak || Spacewatch || — || align=right | 2.4 km || 
|-id=745 bgcolor=#E9E9E9
| 260745 ||  || — || June 16, 2005 || Reedy Creek || J. Broughton || EUN || align=right | 1.9 km || 
|-id=746 bgcolor=#E9E9E9
| 260746 ||  || — || June 26, 2005 || Palomar || NEAT || EUN || align=right | 1.8 km || 
|-id=747 bgcolor=#E9E9E9
| 260747 ||  || — || June 27, 2005 || Kitt Peak || Spacewatch || MAR || align=right | 1.0 km || 
|-id=748 bgcolor=#fefefe
| 260748 ||  || — || June 28, 2005 || Palomar || NEAT || V || align=right data-sort-value="0.99" | 990 m || 
|-id=749 bgcolor=#E9E9E9
| 260749 ||  || — || June 29, 2005 || Catalina || CSS || — || align=right | 2.5 km || 
|-id=750 bgcolor=#E9E9E9
| 260750 ||  || — || June 27, 2005 || Kitt Peak || Spacewatch || — || align=right | 1.3 km || 
|-id=751 bgcolor=#E9E9E9
| 260751 ||  || — || June 29, 2005 || Kitt Peak || Spacewatch || ADE || align=right | 2.4 km || 
|-id=752 bgcolor=#E9E9E9
| 260752 ||  || — || June 30, 2005 || Kitt Peak || Spacewatch || — || align=right | 1.2 km || 
|-id=753 bgcolor=#fefefe
| 260753 ||  || — || June 30, 2005 || Kitt Peak || Spacewatch || — || align=right | 1.2 km || 
|-id=754 bgcolor=#E9E9E9
| 260754 ||  || — || June 27, 2005 || Kitt Peak || Spacewatch || MIS || align=right | 2.8 km || 
|-id=755 bgcolor=#fefefe
| 260755 ||  || — || June 29, 2005 || Kitt Peak || Spacewatch || — || align=right | 1.0 km || 
|-id=756 bgcolor=#d6d6d6
| 260756 ||  || — || June 29, 2005 || Kitt Peak || Spacewatch || — || align=right | 2.8 km || 
|-id=757 bgcolor=#E9E9E9
| 260757 ||  || — || June 29, 2005 || Kitt Peak || Spacewatch || — || align=right | 1.7 km || 
|-id=758 bgcolor=#E9E9E9
| 260758 ||  || — || June 29, 2005 || Palomar || NEAT || — || align=right | 1.7 km || 
|-id=759 bgcolor=#E9E9E9
| 260759 ||  || — || June 30, 2005 || Kitt Peak || Spacewatch || — || align=right | 3.2 km || 
|-id=760 bgcolor=#E9E9E9
| 260760 ||  || — || June 21, 2005 || Palomar || NEAT || MAR || align=right | 1.6 km || 
|-id=761 bgcolor=#E9E9E9
| 260761 ||  || — || June 27, 2005 || Palomar || NEAT || — || align=right | 2.4 km || 
|-id=762 bgcolor=#E9E9E9
| 260762 ||  || — || June 27, 2005 || Mount Lemmon || Mount Lemmon Survey || — || align=right | 2.2 km || 
|-id=763 bgcolor=#E9E9E9
| 260763 ||  || — || June 27, 2005 || Mount Lemmon || Mount Lemmon Survey || — || align=right | 1.8 km || 
|-id=764 bgcolor=#E9E9E9
| 260764 ||  || — || June 28, 2005 || Kitt Peak || Spacewatch || — || align=right | 1.1 km || 
|-id=765 bgcolor=#E9E9E9
| 260765 ||  || — || June 28, 2005 || Palomar || NEAT || — || align=right | 2.0 km || 
|-id=766 bgcolor=#E9E9E9
| 260766 ||  || — || June 29, 2005 || Catalina || CSS || — || align=right | 1.8 km || 
|-id=767 bgcolor=#E9E9E9
| 260767 ||  || — || June 29, 2005 || Palomar || NEAT || — || align=right | 1.8 km || 
|-id=768 bgcolor=#E9E9E9
| 260768 ||  || — || June 29, 2005 || Palomar || NEAT || — || align=right | 1.3 km || 
|-id=769 bgcolor=#E9E9E9
| 260769 ||  || — || June 30, 2005 || Kitt Peak || Spacewatch || — || align=right | 3.6 km || 
|-id=770 bgcolor=#fefefe
| 260770 ||  || — || July 2, 2005 || Kitt Peak || Spacewatch || — || align=right | 1.2 km || 
|-id=771 bgcolor=#fefefe
| 260771 ||  || — || July 1, 2005 || Kitt Peak || Spacewatch || — || align=right | 1.3 km || 
|-id=772 bgcolor=#E9E9E9
| 260772 ||  || — || July 1, 2005 || Kitt Peak || Spacewatch || — || align=right | 1.5 km || 
|-id=773 bgcolor=#E9E9E9
| 260773 ||  || — || July 3, 2005 || Mount Lemmon || Mount Lemmon Survey || — || align=right | 2.5 km || 
|-id=774 bgcolor=#E9E9E9
| 260774 ||  || — || July 1, 2005 || Kitt Peak || Spacewatch || — || align=right | 1.1 km || 
|-id=775 bgcolor=#fefefe
| 260775 ||  || — || July 1, 2005 || Kitt Peak || Spacewatch || — || align=right | 1.0 km || 
|-id=776 bgcolor=#fefefe
| 260776 ||  || — || July 1, 2005 || Kitt Peak || Spacewatch || — || align=right | 1.2 km || 
|-id=777 bgcolor=#d6d6d6
| 260777 ||  || — || July 3, 2005 || Mount Lemmon || Mount Lemmon Survey || — || align=right | 2.7 km || 
|-id=778 bgcolor=#d6d6d6
| 260778 ||  || — || July 5, 2005 || Kitt Peak || Spacewatch || EOS || align=right | 2.5 km || 
|-id=779 bgcolor=#E9E9E9
| 260779 ||  || — || July 2, 2005 || Kitt Peak || Spacewatch || — || align=right | 1.9 km || 
|-id=780 bgcolor=#fefefe
| 260780 ||  || — || July 5, 2005 || Kitt Peak || Spacewatch || — || align=right | 1.1 km || 
|-id=781 bgcolor=#E9E9E9
| 260781 ||  || — || July 5, 2005 || Kitt Peak || Spacewatch || — || align=right | 1.4 km || 
|-id=782 bgcolor=#E9E9E9
| 260782 ||  || — || July 5, 2005 || Kitt Peak || Spacewatch || MRX || align=right | 1.3 km || 
|-id=783 bgcolor=#E9E9E9
| 260783 ||  || — || July 7, 2005 || Reedy Creek || J. Broughton || — || align=right | 3.3 km || 
|-id=784 bgcolor=#E9E9E9
| 260784 ||  || — || July 5, 2005 || Palomar || NEAT || — || align=right | 2.9 km || 
|-id=785 bgcolor=#E9E9E9
| 260785 ||  || — || July 3, 2005 || Mount Lemmon || Mount Lemmon Survey || WIT || align=right | 1.1 km || 
|-id=786 bgcolor=#E9E9E9
| 260786 ||  || — || July 3, 2005 || Mount Lemmon || Mount Lemmon Survey || WIT || align=right | 1.4 km || 
|-id=787 bgcolor=#E9E9E9
| 260787 ||  || — || July 3, 2005 || Mount Lemmon || Mount Lemmon Survey || — || align=right | 1.1 km || 
|-id=788 bgcolor=#E9E9E9
| 260788 ||  || — || July 3, 2005 || Mount Lemmon || Mount Lemmon Survey || HOF || align=right | 3.0 km || 
|-id=789 bgcolor=#fefefe
| 260789 ||  || — || July 5, 2005 || Mount Lemmon || Mount Lemmon Survey || V || align=right data-sort-value="0.77" | 770 m || 
|-id=790 bgcolor=#d6d6d6
| 260790 ||  || — || July 6, 2005 || Kitt Peak || Spacewatch || — || align=right | 3.2 km || 
|-id=791 bgcolor=#E9E9E9
| 260791 ||  || — || July 6, 2005 || Campo Imperatore || CINEOS || — || align=right | 1.5 km || 
|-id=792 bgcolor=#E9E9E9
| 260792 ||  || — || July 10, 2005 || Kitt Peak || Spacewatch || WIT || align=right | 1.2 km || 
|-id=793 bgcolor=#E9E9E9
| 260793 ||  || — || July 11, 2005 || Mount Lemmon || Mount Lemmon Survey || — || align=right | 2.6 km || 
|-id=794 bgcolor=#E9E9E9
| 260794 ||  || — || July 10, 2005 || Kitt Peak || Spacewatch || — || align=right | 2.2 km || 
|-id=795 bgcolor=#d6d6d6
| 260795 ||  || — || July 10, 2005 || Kitt Peak || Spacewatch || — || align=right | 3.6 km || 
|-id=796 bgcolor=#E9E9E9
| 260796 ||  || — || July 9, 2005 || Reedy Creek || J. Broughton || — || align=right | 1.4 km || 
|-id=797 bgcolor=#E9E9E9
| 260797 ||  || — || July 2, 2005 || Kitt Peak || Spacewatch || — || align=right | 1.7 km || 
|-id=798 bgcolor=#fefefe
| 260798 ||  || — || July 3, 2005 || Mount Lemmon || Mount Lemmon Survey || — || align=right data-sort-value="0.94" | 940 m || 
|-id=799 bgcolor=#E9E9E9
| 260799 ||  || — || July 4, 2005 || Kitt Peak || Spacewatch || — || align=right | 1.3 km || 
|-id=800 bgcolor=#E9E9E9
| 260800 ||  || — || July 7, 2005 || Kitt Peak || Spacewatch || — || align=right | 2.5 km || 
|}

260801–260900 

|-bgcolor=#E9E9E9
| 260801 ||  || — || July 2, 2005 || Catalina || CSS || ADE || align=right | 3.1 km || 
|-id=802 bgcolor=#fefefe
| 260802 ||  || — || July 7, 2005 || Mauna Kea || C. Veillet || — || align=right data-sort-value="0.96" | 960 m || 
|-id=803 bgcolor=#E9E9E9
| 260803 ||  || — || July 7, 2005 || Mauna Kea || C. Veillet || HOF || align=right | 3.1 km || 
|-id=804 bgcolor=#E9E9E9
| 260804 ||  || — || July 4, 2005 || Palomar || NEAT || — || align=right | 2.8 km || 
|-id=805 bgcolor=#E9E9E9
| 260805 ||  || — || July 6, 2005 || Kitt Peak || Spacewatch || — || align=right | 1.8 km || 
|-id=806 bgcolor=#E9E9E9
| 260806 ||  || — || July 5, 2005 || Kitt Peak || Spacewatch || — || align=right | 1.6 km || 
|-id=807 bgcolor=#d6d6d6
| 260807 ||  || — || July 26, 2005 || Palomar || NEAT || CHA || align=right | 3.2 km || 
|-id=808 bgcolor=#E9E9E9
| 260808 ||  || — || July 26, 2005 || Palomar || NEAT || MAR || align=right | 1.7 km || 
|-id=809 bgcolor=#E9E9E9
| 260809 ||  || — || July 27, 2005 || Siding Spring || SSS || — || align=right | 3.5 km || 
|-id=810 bgcolor=#E9E9E9
| 260810 ||  || — || July 28, 2005 || Reedy Creek || J. Broughton || — || align=right | 1.9 km || 
|-id=811 bgcolor=#E9E9E9
| 260811 ||  || — || July 28, 2005 || Palomar || NEAT || — || align=right | 3.2 km || 
|-id=812 bgcolor=#d6d6d6
| 260812 ||  || — || July 28, 2005 || Palomar || NEAT || — || align=right | 4.3 km || 
|-id=813 bgcolor=#E9E9E9
| 260813 ||  || — || July 27, 2005 || Palomar || NEAT || — || align=right | 1.8 km || 
|-id=814 bgcolor=#E9E9E9
| 260814 ||  || — || July 27, 2005 || Palomar || NEAT || KRM || align=right | 3.4 km || 
|-id=815 bgcolor=#E9E9E9
| 260815 ||  || — || July 27, 2005 || Siding Spring || SSS || — || align=right | 1.7 km || 
|-id=816 bgcolor=#E9E9E9
| 260816 ||  || — || July 31, 2005 || Siding Spring || SSS || — || align=right | 4.0 km || 
|-id=817 bgcolor=#E9E9E9
| 260817 ||  || — || July 30, 2005 || Palomar || NEAT || KON || align=right | 2.2 km || 
|-id=818 bgcolor=#E9E9E9
| 260818 ||  || — || July 31, 2005 || Palomar || NEAT || — || align=right | 2.8 km || 
|-id=819 bgcolor=#E9E9E9
| 260819 ||  || — || July 30, 2005 || Palomar || NEAT || — || align=right | 1.7 km || 
|-id=820 bgcolor=#E9E9E9
| 260820 ||  || — || August 4, 2005 || Palomar || NEAT || — || align=right | 2.0 km || 
|-id=821 bgcolor=#d6d6d6
| 260821 ||  || — || August 4, 2005 || Palomar || NEAT || — || align=right | 2.8 km || 
|-id=822 bgcolor=#E9E9E9
| 260822 ||  || — || August 4, 2005 || Palomar || NEAT || — || align=right | 2.5 km || 
|-id=823 bgcolor=#E9E9E9
| 260823 ||  || — || August 10, 2005 || Siding Spring || SSS || — || align=right | 2.4 km || 
|-id=824 bgcolor=#E9E9E9
| 260824 Hermanus ||  ||  || August 9, 2005 || Cerro Tololo || D. E. Trilling || — || align=right | 2.6 km || 
|-id=825 bgcolor=#E9E9E9
| 260825 ||  || — || August 9, 2005 || Cerro Tololo || M. W. Buie || — || align=right | 1.7 km || 
|-id=826 bgcolor=#E9E9E9
| 260826 || 2005 QB || — || August 17, 2005 || Ottmarsheim || Ottmarsheim Obs. || — || align=right | 3.1 km || 
|-id=827 bgcolor=#d6d6d6
| 260827 ||  || — || August 24, 2005 || Palomar || NEAT || THM || align=right | 2.6 km || 
|-id=828 bgcolor=#E9E9E9
| 260828 ||  || — || August 25, 2005 || Palomar || NEAT || JUN || align=right | 1.1 km || 
|-id=829 bgcolor=#E9E9E9
| 260829 ||  || — || August 25, 2005 || Palomar || NEAT || — || align=right | 2.5 km || 
|-id=830 bgcolor=#E9E9E9
| 260830 ||  || — || August 25, 2005 || Palomar || NEAT || HOF || align=right | 3.2 km || 
|-id=831 bgcolor=#E9E9E9
| 260831 ||  || — || August 26, 2005 || Campo Imperatore || CINEOS || MRX || align=right | 1.4 km || 
|-id=832 bgcolor=#E9E9E9
| 260832 ||  || — || August 27, 2005 || Kitt Peak || Spacewatch || HOF || align=right | 2.6 km || 
|-id=833 bgcolor=#d6d6d6
| 260833 ||  || — || August 27, 2005 || Kitt Peak || Spacewatch || KOR || align=right | 2.0 km || 
|-id=834 bgcolor=#E9E9E9
| 260834 ||  || — || August 27, 2005 || Kitt Peak || Spacewatch || — || align=right | 2.2 km || 
|-id=835 bgcolor=#E9E9E9
| 260835 ||  || — || August 29, 2005 || Wrightwood || J. W. Young || — || align=right | 1.9 km || 
|-id=836 bgcolor=#E9E9E9
| 260836 ||  || — || August 25, 2005 || Palomar || NEAT || — || align=right | 1.8 km || 
|-id=837 bgcolor=#E9E9E9
| 260837 ||  || — || August 26, 2005 || Anderson Mesa || LONEOS || — || align=right | 2.4 km || 
|-id=838 bgcolor=#E9E9E9
| 260838 ||  || — || August 26, 2005 || Anderson Mesa || LONEOS || — || align=right | 2.2 km || 
|-id=839 bgcolor=#E9E9E9
| 260839 ||  || — || August 26, 2005 || Palomar || NEAT || GEF || align=right | 1.6 km || 
|-id=840 bgcolor=#d6d6d6
| 260840 ||  || — || August 26, 2005 || Palomar || NEAT || — || align=right | 3.3 km || 
|-id=841 bgcolor=#d6d6d6
| 260841 ||  || — || August 28, 2005 || Kitt Peak || Spacewatch || EOS || align=right | 2.7 km || 
|-id=842 bgcolor=#d6d6d6
| 260842 ||  || — || August 26, 2005 || Palomar || NEAT || — || align=right | 4.8 km || 
|-id=843 bgcolor=#d6d6d6
| 260843 ||  || — || August 26, 2005 || Palomar || NEAT || — || align=right | 3.2 km || 
|-id=844 bgcolor=#d6d6d6
| 260844 ||  || — || August 26, 2005 || Palomar || NEAT || EOS || align=right | 2.4 km || 
|-id=845 bgcolor=#d6d6d6
| 260845 ||  || — || August 26, 2005 || Palomar || NEAT || — || align=right | 3.6 km || 
|-id=846 bgcolor=#E9E9E9
| 260846 ||  || — || August 26, 2005 || Palomar || NEAT || — || align=right | 1.8 km || 
|-id=847 bgcolor=#fefefe
| 260847 ||  || — || August 26, 2005 || Palomar || NEAT || — || align=right | 1.1 km || 
|-id=848 bgcolor=#E9E9E9
| 260848 ||  || — || August 26, 2005 || Palomar || NEAT || — || align=right | 2.0 km || 
|-id=849 bgcolor=#E9E9E9
| 260849 ||  || — || August 29, 2005 || Anderson Mesa || LONEOS || MRX || align=right | 1.5 km || 
|-id=850 bgcolor=#d6d6d6
| 260850 ||  || — || August 25, 2005 || Palomar || NEAT || KAR || align=right | 1.3 km || 
|-id=851 bgcolor=#d6d6d6
| 260851 ||  || — || August 25, 2005 || Palomar || NEAT || EMA || align=right | 4.4 km || 
|-id=852 bgcolor=#fefefe
| 260852 ||  || — || August 26, 2005 || Palomar || NEAT || V || align=right | 1.1 km || 
|-id=853 bgcolor=#E9E9E9
| 260853 ||  || — || August 27, 2005 || Anderson Mesa || LONEOS || — || align=right | 3.6 km || 
|-id=854 bgcolor=#E9E9E9
| 260854 ||  || — || August 29, 2005 || Goodricke-Pigott || R. A. Tucker || — || align=right | 3.1 km || 
|-id=855 bgcolor=#E9E9E9
| 260855 ||  || — || August 30, 2005 || Campo Imperatore || CINEOS || JUN || align=right | 1.6 km || 
|-id=856 bgcolor=#d6d6d6
| 260856 ||  || — || August 30, 2005 || Socorro || LINEAR || — || align=right | 2.7 km || 
|-id=857 bgcolor=#d6d6d6
| 260857 ||  || — || August 30, 2005 || Kitt Peak || Spacewatch || — || align=right | 3.1 km || 
|-id=858 bgcolor=#E9E9E9
| 260858 ||  || — || August 30, 2005 || Anderson Mesa || LONEOS || — || align=right | 2.7 km || 
|-id=859 bgcolor=#E9E9E9
| 260859 ||  || — || August 30, 2005 || Kitt Peak || Spacewatch || — || align=right | 2.2 km || 
|-id=860 bgcolor=#fefefe
| 260860 ||  || — || August 24, 2005 || Palomar || NEAT || SUL || align=right | 2.3 km || 
|-id=861 bgcolor=#E9E9E9
| 260861 ||  || — || August 24, 2005 || Palomar || NEAT || — || align=right | 2.0 km || 
|-id=862 bgcolor=#E9E9E9
| 260862 ||  || — || August 25, 2005 || Palomar || NEAT || — || align=right | 5.2 km || 
|-id=863 bgcolor=#E9E9E9
| 260863 ||  || — || August 26, 2005 || Anderson Mesa || LONEOS || AGN || align=right | 1.7 km || 
|-id=864 bgcolor=#E9E9E9
| 260864 ||  || — || August 26, 2005 || Palomar || NEAT || — || align=right | 1.8 km || 
|-id=865 bgcolor=#E9E9E9
| 260865 ||  || — || August 27, 2005 || Palomar || NEAT || — || align=right | 1.2 km || 
|-id=866 bgcolor=#d6d6d6
| 260866 ||  || — || August 27, 2005 || Palomar || NEAT || CHA || align=right | 3.0 km || 
|-id=867 bgcolor=#E9E9E9
| 260867 ||  || — || August 27, 2005 || Palomar || NEAT || — || align=right | 1.2 km || 
|-id=868 bgcolor=#E9E9E9
| 260868 ||  || — || August 27, 2005 || Palomar || NEAT || — || align=right | 1.6 km || 
|-id=869 bgcolor=#E9E9E9
| 260869 ||  || — || August 27, 2005 || Palomar || NEAT || — || align=right | 1.4 km || 
|-id=870 bgcolor=#E9E9E9
| 260870 ||  || — || August 27, 2005 || Palomar || NEAT || PAD || align=right | 1.8 km || 
|-id=871 bgcolor=#E9E9E9
| 260871 ||  || — || August 27, 2005 || Palomar || NEAT || — || align=right | 1.2 km || 
|-id=872 bgcolor=#d6d6d6
| 260872 ||  || — || August 27, 2005 || Palomar || NEAT || — || align=right | 3.3 km || 
|-id=873 bgcolor=#E9E9E9
| 260873 ||  || — || August 27, 2005 || Palomar || NEAT || — || align=right | 1.2 km || 
|-id=874 bgcolor=#E9E9E9
| 260874 ||  || — || August 28, 2005 || Kitt Peak || Spacewatch || — || align=right | 2.5 km || 
|-id=875 bgcolor=#d6d6d6
| 260875 ||  || — || August 28, 2005 || Kitt Peak || Spacewatch || KAR || align=right | 1.3 km || 
|-id=876 bgcolor=#d6d6d6
| 260876 ||  || — || August 28, 2005 || Kitt Peak || Spacewatch || KOR || align=right | 1.4 km || 
|-id=877 bgcolor=#d6d6d6
| 260877 ||  || — || August 28, 2005 || Kitt Peak || Spacewatch || KOR || align=right | 1.3 km || 
|-id=878 bgcolor=#d6d6d6
| 260878 ||  || — || August 28, 2005 || Kitt Peak || Spacewatch || — || align=right | 3.4 km || 
|-id=879 bgcolor=#E9E9E9
| 260879 ||  || — || August 28, 2005 || Kitt Peak || Spacewatch || — || align=right | 2.5 km || 
|-id=880 bgcolor=#E9E9E9
| 260880 ||  || — || August 28, 2005 || Kitt Peak || Spacewatch || WIT || align=right | 1.6 km || 
|-id=881 bgcolor=#d6d6d6
| 260881 ||  || — || August 28, 2005 || Kitt Peak || Spacewatch || KOR || align=right | 1.3 km || 
|-id=882 bgcolor=#d6d6d6
| 260882 ||  || — || August 28, 2005 || Kitt Peak || Spacewatch || — || align=right | 2.8 km || 
|-id=883 bgcolor=#E9E9E9
| 260883 ||  || — || August 28, 2005 || Kitt Peak || Spacewatch || — || align=right | 2.4 km || 
|-id=884 bgcolor=#E9E9E9
| 260884 ||  || — || August 28, 2005 || Kitt Peak || Spacewatch || — || align=right | 1.6 km || 
|-id=885 bgcolor=#d6d6d6
| 260885 ||  || — || August 30, 2005 || Socorro || LINEAR || — || align=right | 3.5 km || 
|-id=886 bgcolor=#d6d6d6
| 260886 Henritudor ||  ||  || August 31, 2005 || Côtes de Meuse || M. Dawson || — || align=right | 4.1 km || 
|-id=887 bgcolor=#E9E9E9
| 260887 ||  || — || August 31, 2005 || Kitt Peak || Spacewatch || WIT || align=right | 1.1 km || 
|-id=888 bgcolor=#E9E9E9
| 260888 ||  || — || August 27, 2005 || Palomar || NEAT || EUN || align=right | 2.0 km || 
|-id=889 bgcolor=#E9E9E9
| 260889 ||  || — || August 28, 2005 || Siding Spring || SSS || — || align=right | 2.1 km || 
|-id=890 bgcolor=#d6d6d6
| 260890 ||  || — || August 27, 2005 || Palomar || NEAT || — || align=right | 3.6 km || 
|-id=891 bgcolor=#d6d6d6
| 260891 ||  || — || August 26, 2005 || Anderson Mesa || LONEOS || — || align=right | 3.2 km || 
|-id=892 bgcolor=#E9E9E9
| 260892 ||  || — || August 27, 2005 || Palomar || NEAT || — || align=right | 2.7 km || 
|-id=893 bgcolor=#E9E9E9
| 260893 ||  || — || August 28, 2005 || Anderson Mesa || LONEOS || EUN || align=right | 1.8 km || 
|-id=894 bgcolor=#E9E9E9
| 260894 ||  || — || August 27, 2005 || Palomar || NEAT || — || align=right | 2.9 km || 
|-id=895 bgcolor=#d6d6d6
| 260895 ||  || — || August 29, 2005 || Palomar || NEAT || — || align=right | 4.5 km || 
|-id=896 bgcolor=#E9E9E9
| 260896 ||  || — || August 25, 2005 || Palomar || NEAT || INO || align=right | 1.4 km || 
|-id=897 bgcolor=#d6d6d6
| 260897 ||  || — || August 30, 2005 || Kitt Peak || Spacewatch || — || align=right | 3.9 km || 
|-id=898 bgcolor=#E9E9E9
| 260898 ||  || — || August 31, 2005 || Kitt Peak || Spacewatch || — || align=right | 2.2 km || 
|-id=899 bgcolor=#d6d6d6
| 260899 ||  || — || August 31, 2005 || Kitt Peak || Spacewatch || — || align=right | 3.5 km || 
|-id=900 bgcolor=#d6d6d6
| 260900 ||  || — || August 31, 2005 || Palomar || NEAT || — || align=right | 2.6 km || 
|}

260901–261000 

|-bgcolor=#E9E9E9
| 260901 ||  || — || August 31, 2005 || Palomar || NEAT || — || align=right | 2.8 km || 
|-id=902 bgcolor=#E9E9E9
| 260902 ||  || — || August 31, 2005 || Kitt Peak || Spacewatch || — || align=right | 2.3 km || 
|-id=903 bgcolor=#E9E9E9
| 260903 ||  || — || August 30, 2005 || Kitt Peak || Spacewatch || AST || align=right | 1.7 km || 
|-id=904 bgcolor=#E9E9E9
| 260904 ||  || — || August 30, 2005 || Kitt Peak || Spacewatch || HOF || align=right | 2.5 km || 
|-id=905 bgcolor=#E9E9E9
| 260905 ||  || — || September 2, 2005 || Palomar || NEAT || POS || align=right | 3.9 km || 
|-id=906 bgcolor=#E9E9E9
| 260906 Robichon ||  ||  || September 1, 2005 || Vicques || M. Ory || DOR || align=right | 5.2 km || 
|-id=907 bgcolor=#E9E9E9
| 260907 ||  || — || September 1, 2005 || Palomar || NEAT || — || align=right | 3.0 km || 
|-id=908 bgcolor=#E9E9E9
| 260908 ||  || — || September 6, 2005 || Anderson Mesa || LONEOS || — || align=right | 3.1 km || 
|-id=909 bgcolor=#E9E9E9
| 260909 ||  || — || September 1, 2005 || Palomar || NEAT || — || align=right | 2.7 km || 
|-id=910 bgcolor=#d6d6d6
| 260910 ||  || — || September 10, 2005 || Kingsnake || J. V. McClusky || — || align=right | 3.2 km || 
|-id=911 bgcolor=#E9E9E9
| 260911 ||  || — || September 1, 2005 || Kitt Peak || Spacewatch || — || align=right | 1.5 km || 
|-id=912 bgcolor=#E9E9E9
| 260912 ||  || — || September 1, 2005 || Kitt Peak || Spacewatch || — || align=right | 2.8 km || 
|-id=913 bgcolor=#E9E9E9
| 260913 ||  || — || September 1, 2005 || Kitt Peak || Spacewatch || — || align=right | 2.1 km || 
|-id=914 bgcolor=#E9E9E9
| 260914 ||  || — || September 1, 2005 || Anderson Mesa || LONEOS || — || align=right | 4.2 km || 
|-id=915 bgcolor=#E9E9E9
| 260915 ||  || — || September 1, 2005 || Kitt Peak || Spacewatch || — || align=right | 1.8 km || 
|-id=916 bgcolor=#d6d6d6
| 260916 ||  || — || September 1, 2005 || Kitt Peak || Spacewatch || VER || align=right | 3.2 km || 
|-id=917 bgcolor=#d6d6d6
| 260917 ||  || — || September 1, 2005 || Palomar || NEAT || — || align=right | 5.0 km || 
|-id=918 bgcolor=#E9E9E9
| 260918 ||  || — || September 10, 2005 || Anderson Mesa || LONEOS || — || align=right | 2.7 km || 
|-id=919 bgcolor=#E9E9E9
| 260919 ||  || — || September 10, 2005 || Anderson Mesa || LONEOS || — || align=right | 3.4 km || 
|-id=920 bgcolor=#E9E9E9
| 260920 ||  || — || September 10, 2005 || Anderson Mesa || LONEOS || — || align=right | 2.5 km || 
|-id=921 bgcolor=#E9E9E9
| 260921 ||  || — || September 12, 2005 || Anderson Mesa || LONEOS || — || align=right | 4.8 km || 
|-id=922 bgcolor=#E9E9E9
| 260922 ||  || — || September 8, 2005 || Socorro || LINEAR || — || align=right | 2.8 km || 
|-id=923 bgcolor=#E9E9E9
| 260923 ||  || — || September 12, 2005 || Anderson Mesa || LONEOS || — || align=right | 3.9 km || 
|-id=924 bgcolor=#E9E9E9
| 260924 ||  || — || September 13, 2005 || Anderson Mesa || LONEOS || — || align=right | 2.1 km || 
|-id=925 bgcolor=#E9E9E9
| 260925 ||  || — || September 13, 2005 || Kitt Peak || Spacewatch || PAD || align=right | 2.2 km || 
|-id=926 bgcolor=#E9E9E9
| 260926 ||  || — || September 13, 2005 || Socorro || LINEAR || — || align=right | 4.7 km || 
|-id=927 bgcolor=#E9E9E9
| 260927 ||  || — || September 13, 2005 || Kitt Peak || Spacewatch || HEN || align=right | 1.3 km || 
|-id=928 bgcolor=#E9E9E9
| 260928 ||  || — || September 2, 2005 || Palomar || NEAT || MAR || align=right | 1.7 km || 
|-id=929 bgcolor=#d6d6d6
| 260929 ||  || — || September 1, 2005 || Palomar || NEAT || — || align=right | 3.2 km || 
|-id=930 bgcolor=#E9E9E9
| 260930 ||  || — || September 3, 2005 || Palomar || NEAT || — || align=right | 3.4 km || 
|-id=931 bgcolor=#d6d6d6
| 260931 ||  || — || September 14, 2005 || Apache Point || A. C. Becker || — || align=right | 4.2 km || 
|-id=932 bgcolor=#d6d6d6
| 260932 ||  || — || September 12, 2005 || Kitt Peak || Spacewatch || EOS || align=right | 2.9 km || 
|-id=933 bgcolor=#E9E9E9
| 260933 ||  || — || September 3, 2005 || Catalina || CSS || — || align=right | 2.2 km || 
|-id=934 bgcolor=#E9E9E9
| 260934 ||  || — || September 14, 2005 || Catalina || CSS || — || align=right | 2.7 km || 
|-id=935 bgcolor=#d6d6d6
| 260935 ||  || — || September 24, 2005 || Kitt Peak || Spacewatch || — || align=right | 3.3 km || 
|-id=936 bgcolor=#E9E9E9
| 260936 ||  || — || September 24, 2005 || Kitt Peak || Spacewatch || — || align=right | 1.5 km || 
|-id=937 bgcolor=#d6d6d6
| 260937 ||  || — || September 25, 2005 || Catalina || CSS || — || align=right | 3.4 km || 
|-id=938 bgcolor=#E9E9E9
| 260938 ||  || — || September 25, 2005 || Catalina || CSS || — || align=right | 2.9 km || 
|-id=939 bgcolor=#d6d6d6
| 260939 ||  || — || September 24, 2005 || Goodricke-Pigott || R. A. Tucker || — || align=right | 3.8 km || 
|-id=940 bgcolor=#E9E9E9
| 260940 ||  || — || September 25, 2005 || Kitt Peak || Spacewatch || — || align=right | 1.7 km || 
|-id=941 bgcolor=#d6d6d6
| 260941 ||  || — || September 23, 2005 || Kitt Peak || Spacewatch || — || align=right | 2.6 km || 
|-id=942 bgcolor=#E9E9E9
| 260942 ||  || — || September 23, 2005 || Catalina || CSS || — || align=right | 3.3 km || 
|-id=943 bgcolor=#E9E9E9
| 260943 ||  || — || September 24, 2005 || Kitt Peak || Spacewatch || — || align=right | 1.7 km || 
|-id=944 bgcolor=#d6d6d6
| 260944 ||  || — || September 26, 2005 || Kitt Peak || Spacewatch || — || align=right | 2.9 km || 
|-id=945 bgcolor=#E9E9E9
| 260945 ||  || — || September 26, 2005 || Kitt Peak || Spacewatch || HOF || align=right | 3.1 km || 
|-id=946 bgcolor=#d6d6d6
| 260946 ||  || — || September 26, 2005 || Kitt Peak || Spacewatch || VER || align=right | 3.4 km || 
|-id=947 bgcolor=#E9E9E9
| 260947 ||  || — || September 26, 2005 || Kitt Peak || Spacewatch || — || align=right | 2.7 km || 
|-id=948 bgcolor=#E9E9E9
| 260948 ||  || — || September 26, 2005 || Kitt Peak || Spacewatch || — || align=right | 1.8 km || 
|-id=949 bgcolor=#E9E9E9
| 260949 ||  || — || September 26, 2005 || Kitt Peak || Spacewatch || HEN || align=right | 1.3 km || 
|-id=950 bgcolor=#E9E9E9
| 260950 ||  || — || September 25, 2005 || Kingsnake || J. V. McClusky || INO || align=right | 1.7 km || 
|-id=951 bgcolor=#E9E9E9
| 260951 ||  || — || September 23, 2005 || Kitt Peak || Spacewatch || HNA || align=right | 3.0 km || 
|-id=952 bgcolor=#d6d6d6
| 260952 ||  || — || September 23, 2005 || Kitt Peak || Spacewatch || — || align=right | 4.2 km || 
|-id=953 bgcolor=#E9E9E9
| 260953 ||  || — || September 23, 2005 || Kitt Peak || Spacewatch || — || align=right | 2.8 km || 
|-id=954 bgcolor=#E9E9E9
| 260954 ||  || — || September 23, 2005 || Kitt Peak || Spacewatch || — || align=right | 2.1 km || 
|-id=955 bgcolor=#d6d6d6
| 260955 ||  || — || September 23, 2005 || Kitt Peak || Spacewatch || EUP || align=right | 3.6 km || 
|-id=956 bgcolor=#d6d6d6
| 260956 ||  || — || September 23, 2005 || Kitt Peak || Spacewatch || EOS || align=right | 2.1 km || 
|-id=957 bgcolor=#d6d6d6
| 260957 ||  || — || September 24, 2005 || Kitt Peak || Spacewatch || — || align=right | 3.2 km || 
|-id=958 bgcolor=#d6d6d6
| 260958 ||  || — || September 24, 2005 || Kitt Peak || Spacewatch || — || align=right | 2.7 km || 
|-id=959 bgcolor=#E9E9E9
| 260959 ||  || — || September 24, 2005 || Kitt Peak || Spacewatch || HOF || align=right | 3.0 km || 
|-id=960 bgcolor=#E9E9E9
| 260960 ||  || — || September 24, 2005 || Kitt Peak || Spacewatch || — || align=right | 2.0 km || 
|-id=961 bgcolor=#d6d6d6
| 260961 ||  || — || September 24, 2005 || Kitt Peak || Spacewatch || — || align=right | 4.5 km || 
|-id=962 bgcolor=#d6d6d6
| 260962 ||  || — || September 24, 2005 || Kitt Peak || Spacewatch || — || align=right | 3.6 km || 
|-id=963 bgcolor=#E9E9E9
| 260963 ||  || — || September 24, 2005 || Kitt Peak || Spacewatch || GEF || align=right | 1.7 km || 
|-id=964 bgcolor=#d6d6d6
| 260964 ||  || — || September 24, 2005 || Kitt Peak || Spacewatch || EOS || align=right | 2.2 km || 
|-id=965 bgcolor=#E9E9E9
| 260965 ||  || — || September 24, 2005 || Kitt Peak || Spacewatch || — || align=right | 2.7 km || 
|-id=966 bgcolor=#d6d6d6
| 260966 ||  || — || September 24, 2005 || Kitt Peak || Spacewatch || — || align=right | 4.6 km || 
|-id=967 bgcolor=#E9E9E9
| 260967 ||  || — || September 24, 2005 || Kitt Peak || Spacewatch || — || align=right | 2.8 km || 
|-id=968 bgcolor=#E9E9E9
| 260968 ||  || — || September 24, 2005 || Kitt Peak || Spacewatch || — || align=right | 1.4 km || 
|-id=969 bgcolor=#E9E9E9
| 260969 ||  || — || September 25, 2005 || Kitt Peak || Spacewatch || — || align=right | 2.3 km || 
|-id=970 bgcolor=#d6d6d6
| 260970 ||  || — || September 25, 2005 || Kitt Peak || Spacewatch || fast? || align=right | 3.0 km || 
|-id=971 bgcolor=#E9E9E9
| 260971 ||  || — || September 25, 2005 || Kitt Peak || Spacewatch || POS || align=right | 2.9 km || 
|-id=972 bgcolor=#d6d6d6
| 260972 ||  || — || September 25, 2005 || Kitt Peak || Spacewatch || THM || align=right | 2.3 km || 
|-id=973 bgcolor=#E9E9E9
| 260973 ||  || — || September 26, 2005 || Kitt Peak || Spacewatch || AGN || align=right | 1.6 km || 
|-id=974 bgcolor=#d6d6d6
| 260974 ||  || — || September 26, 2005 || Kitt Peak || Spacewatch || EOS || align=right | 1.6 km || 
|-id=975 bgcolor=#d6d6d6
| 260975 ||  || — || September 26, 2005 || Kitt Peak || Spacewatch || EOS || align=right | 2.4 km || 
|-id=976 bgcolor=#E9E9E9
| 260976 ||  || — || September 26, 2005 || Kitt Peak || Spacewatch || — || align=right | 2.8 km || 
|-id=977 bgcolor=#E9E9E9
| 260977 ||  || — || September 26, 2005 || Kitt Peak || Spacewatch || — || align=right | 2.6 km || 
|-id=978 bgcolor=#d6d6d6
| 260978 ||  || — || September 26, 2005 || Kitt Peak || Spacewatch || THM || align=right | 2.8 km || 
|-id=979 bgcolor=#E9E9E9
| 260979 ||  || — || September 26, 2005 || Kitt Peak || Spacewatch || AGN || align=right | 1.3 km || 
|-id=980 bgcolor=#E9E9E9
| 260980 ||  || — || September 26, 2005 || Kitt Peak || Spacewatch || AST || align=right | 1.8 km || 
|-id=981 bgcolor=#E9E9E9
| 260981 ||  || — || September 26, 2005 || Kitt Peak || Spacewatch || — || align=right | 2.5 km || 
|-id=982 bgcolor=#d6d6d6
| 260982 ||  || — || September 26, 2005 || Kitt Peak || Spacewatch || — || align=right | 3.4 km || 
|-id=983 bgcolor=#E9E9E9
| 260983 ||  || — || September 26, 2005 || Kitt Peak || Spacewatch || MRX || align=right | 1.5 km || 
|-id=984 bgcolor=#E9E9E9
| 260984 ||  || — || September 27, 2005 || Kitt Peak || Spacewatch || — || align=right | 3.7 km || 
|-id=985 bgcolor=#E9E9E9
| 260985 ||  || — || September 23, 2005 || Siding Spring || SSS || — || align=right | 3.6 km || 
|-id=986 bgcolor=#d6d6d6
| 260986 ||  || — || September 24, 2005 || Kitt Peak || Spacewatch || KOR || align=right | 1.3 km || 
|-id=987 bgcolor=#E9E9E9
| 260987 ||  || — || September 24, 2005 || Kitt Peak || Spacewatch || PAD || align=right | 1.5 km || 
|-id=988 bgcolor=#d6d6d6
| 260988 ||  || — || September 24, 2005 || Kitt Peak || Spacewatch || KOR || align=right | 1.3 km || 
|-id=989 bgcolor=#fefefe
| 260989 ||  || — || September 24, 2005 || Kitt Peak || Spacewatch || MAS || align=right | 1.3 km || 
|-id=990 bgcolor=#d6d6d6
| 260990 ||  || — || September 24, 2005 || Kitt Peak || Spacewatch || — || align=right | 3.1 km || 
|-id=991 bgcolor=#E9E9E9
| 260991 ||  || — || September 24, 2005 || Kitt Peak || Spacewatch || — || align=right | 1.3 km || 
|-id=992 bgcolor=#E9E9E9
| 260992 ||  || — || September 24, 2005 || Kitt Peak || Spacewatch || — || align=right | 1.6 km || 
|-id=993 bgcolor=#E9E9E9
| 260993 ||  || — || September 24, 2005 || Kitt Peak || Spacewatch || — || align=right | 3.0 km || 
|-id=994 bgcolor=#E9E9E9
| 260994 ||  || — || September 24, 2005 || Kitt Peak || Spacewatch || AGN || align=right | 1.9 km || 
|-id=995 bgcolor=#E9E9E9
| 260995 ||  || — || September 24, 2005 || Kitt Peak || Spacewatch || — || align=right | 1.9 km || 
|-id=996 bgcolor=#d6d6d6
| 260996 ||  || — || September 24, 2005 || Kitt Peak || Spacewatch || EOS || align=right | 2.3 km || 
|-id=997 bgcolor=#d6d6d6
| 260997 ||  || — || September 24, 2005 || Kitt Peak || Spacewatch || — || align=right | 4.5 km || 
|-id=998 bgcolor=#d6d6d6
| 260998 ||  || — || September 24, 2005 || Kitt Peak || Spacewatch || — || align=right | 3.3 km || 
|-id=999 bgcolor=#E9E9E9
| 260999 ||  || — || September 24, 2005 || Kitt Peak || Spacewatch || HOF || align=right | 3.2 km || 
|-id=000 bgcolor=#E9E9E9
| 261000 ||  || — || September 25, 2005 || Palomar || NEAT || — || align=right | 2.8 km || 
|}

References

External links 
 Discovery Circumstances: Numbered Minor Planets (260001)–(265000) (IAU Minor Planet Center)

0260